= List of monarchs of Vietnam =

Monarch of Vietnam
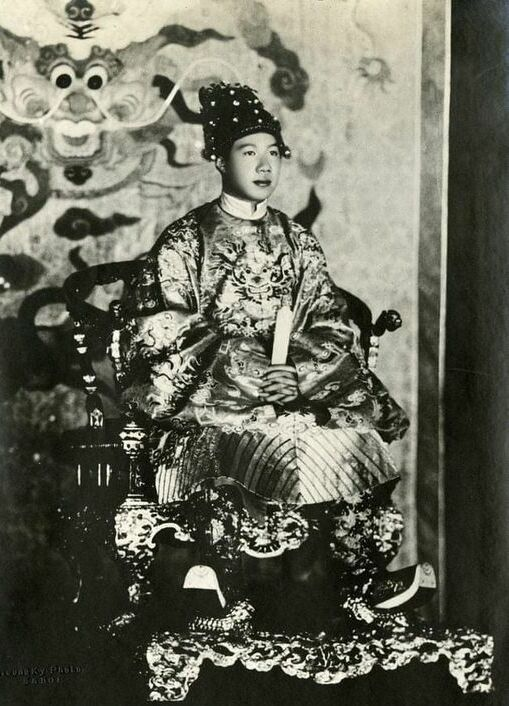
- Emperor Bảo Đại, the last monarch of Vietnam

Details
- First monarch: Kinh Dương Vương (Mythical); An Dương Vương (Historical)
- Last monarch: Bảo Đại
- Formed: 2879 BC (Mythical); 257 BC (Historical)
- Abolished: August 25, 1945
- Residences: Cổ Loa Citadel (257 BC; 939–967); Imperial Citadel of Hoa Lư (968–1009); Imperial Citadel of Thăng Long (1010–1397; 1428–1789); Citadel of the Hồ Dynasty (1400–1407); Imperial City of Huế (1802–1945)
- Pretender: Guy Georges Vĩnh San (son of Emperor Duy Tân)

This article lists the monarchs of Vietnam. Under the emperor at home, king abroad system used by later dynasties, Vietnamese monarchs would use the title of emperor (皇帝, Hoàng đế; or other equivalents) domestically, and the more common term sovereign (𤤰, Vua), king (王, Vương), or his/her (Imperial) Majesty (陛下, Bệ hạ) elsewhere.

== Overview ==
Some Vietnamese monarchs declared themselves rulers (vua), kings (vương), or emperors (hoàng đế). Imperial titles were used for both domestic and foreign affairs, except for diplomatic missions to China where Vietnamese monarchs were regarded as kingship or prince. Many of the Later Lê monarchs were figurehead rulers, with the real powers resting on feudal lords and princes who were technically their servants. Most Vietnamese monarchs are known through their posthumous names or temple names, while the Nguyễn dynasty, the last reigning house is known through their era names.

== Titles ==
=== Vua ===
The general Vietnamese term for "ruler" was vua (𪼀). There is no Chinese character for this term and it only exists in its written form as a chữ Nôm character. The word vua originates from Proto-Vietic and means "father; chief; man". Vua contains connotations of rulership as well as familial kinship, combining the meaning of the Chinese originated word for "king" (vương) with "pater familias" (bó). Some emperors such as Lê Lợi (1428–1433) and Lê Thánh Tông (1460–1497) preferred being called vua while they were still living. During the Lê dynasty (1428–1789), the Chinese style title for "emperor" (hoàng đế) was mostly used during the ceremony in which the posthumous imperial name was bestowed upon the deceased emperor. As a vua, the Viet ruler was expected to be more hands on with their governance than their Chinese counterpart, and Viet peasants were more inclined to blame him directly for their misfortunes than in China. However the role of vua as a more intimate and native term has been questioned by Liam C. Kelley, who suggests that the difference between vương and vua may simply be the result of a modern political argument seeking to demonstrate that Vietnam was Southeast Asian rather than Chinese.

Vua was not used exclusively to the exclusion of other titles or applied only to Viet rulers. The Lao king Anouvong was referred to as both quoc vuong (Ch. guowang; king of a state) as well as vua. Nha vua, meaning "house head" or "monarch", was a common appellation for the Viet emperor and was also used for Anouvong. The king of Siam, Rama III, was called vua as well as Phat vuong (Buddha king).

The title used by Phùng Hưng (? – 789/791), 布蓋大王, may have been an early representation of vua. The latter two characters, 大王, mean "great king" in Chinese. However the first two characters bùgài (布蓋) do not mean anything coherent in Chinese. They have been translated into the Vietnamese expressions bo cái or vua cái. Bo cái dai vuong means "the Great King who is Father and Mother to his people" whereas vua cái dai vuong would simply be "great king" repeated twice, first in Vietnamese and then in Chinese. It was transcribed in the 15th-century Buddhist scripture Phật thuyết đại báo phụ mẫu ân trọng kinh as sībù (司布); in Middle Vietnamese (16th–17th centuries) as ꞗua or bua; becoming vua in Early Modern Vietnamese (18-19th centuries) such as recorded by Alexis-Marie de Rochon's A Voyage to Madagascar and the East Indies.

=== Hoàng đế ===
Hoàng đế (皇帝), meaning "emperor", is a Sino-Vietnamese title borrowed from Chinese (huangdi). Like Chinese emperors, Viet rulers used the title hoàng đế and thiên tử (天子), meaning "son of heaven". The poem Nam quốc sơn hà by Lý Thường Kiệt (1019–1105) contains a line calling the Viet ruler nam đế (emperor of the south).

Minh Mạng was thrice referred to as Đại Hoàng đế ("great emperor"). Minh Mạng referred to himself as Đại Nam Quốc Đại Hoàng đế (great emperor of the great southern land) and insisted that he be addressed by foreign courts as Đức Hoàng đế (virtuous emperor) rather than Vương . This was likely due to his ideological leanings and predilection for Sinic culture. He also insisted that other countries use Chinese in official communications. These demands great offended other courts, especially Rama III.

The mother of the crown prince was called Hoàng Thái Hậu (Great Empress).

=== Vương ===
While Viet rulers were called vua or hoàng đế on most occasions, they were referred to as vương (王), a Sino-Vietnamese title for "king", in official communications with Chinese dynasties. Almost all Viet rulers adopted some sort of tributary relationship with the imperial dynasties of China. The relationship was symbolic and had no effect on Vietnam's management. However, the Viet ruler would style themselves as "king" (vương) when communicating with China's rulers while using hoàng đế to address their own subjects or other Southeast Asian rulers. Even during the Nguyễn dynasty when Viet rulers such as Minh Mạng referred to themselves as emperors especially towards other Southeast Asian courts, Viet embassies to China presented their ruler as the "king of the state of Vietnam". Internally, the Nguyễn saw their relationship with the Qing dynasty as that of equal countries.

In 1710, Nguyễn Phúc Chu was called Dai Viet quoc vuong (king of the great Viet state). In 1834, Minh Mạng called the Cambodian king phien vuong (barbarian king).

=== Chúa ===
Chúa (主), meaning prince, governor, lord, or warlord, was a title that was applied to the Trịnh lords and Nguyễn lords.

=== Phật ===
Buddhism exerted influence on a number of Vietnamese royal titles, such as when the late 12th-century devout Buddhist emperor Lý Cao Tông (r. 1176–1210) demanded his courtiers to refer him as phật (Buddha). His great-grandfather and predecessor Lý Nhân Tông (r. 1072–1127), a great patronizer of the Buddhist sangha, in his stelae inscription erected in 1121, compared himself and his accomplishments with ancient rulers of the Indian subcontinent near the time of Gautama Buddha, particularly king Udayana and emperor Aśoka.

=== Cham titles ===
Cham rulers of the former kingdom of Champa in present-day Central and Southern Vietnam used many titles, mostly derived from Hindu Sanskrit titles. There were prefix titles, among them, Jaya and Śrī, which Śrī (His glorious, His Majesty) was used more commonly before each ruler's name, and sometimes Śrī and Jaya were combined into Śrī Jaya[monarch name]. Royal titles were used to indicate the power and prestige of rulers: raja-di-raja (king of kings), maharajadhiraja (great king of kings), arddharaja (vice king/junior king). After the fall of Vijaya Champa and the Simhavarmanid dynasty in 1471, all Sanskrit titles disappeared from Cham records, due to southern Panduranga rulers styled themselves as Po (native Cham title, which also means "King, His Majesty, Her Majesty"), and Islam gradually replaced Hinduism in post-1471 Champa.

== Ancient period ==
=== Hồng Bàng period ===
According to tradition there were eighteen of the Hùng kings of the Hồng Bàng period, known then as Văn Lang at that time, from around 2879 BC to around 258 BC. Following is the list of 18 lines of Hùng kings as recorded in the book Việt Nam sử lược by Trần Trọng Kim.

King	Given name	Reign, and line of descent
Kinh Dương Vương (涇陽王)	Lộc Tục (祿續)	2879 – 2794 BC, Càn line (支乾)
Lạc Long Quân (貉龍君)	Sùng Lãm (崇纜)	2793 – 2525 BC, Khảm line (支坎)
Hùng Lân vương (雄麟王), Hùng King III	Lân Lang	2524 – 2253 BC, Cấn line (支艮)
Hùng Diệp Vương (雄曄王), Hùng King IV	Bửu Lang	2252 – 1913 BC, Chấn line (支震)
Hùng Hy Vương, Hùng King V	Viên Lang	1912 – 1713 BC, Tốn line (支巽)
Hùng Huy Vương (雄暉王), Hùng King VI	Pháp Hải Lang	1712 – 1632 BC, Ly line (支離)
Hùng Chiêu Vương (雄昭王), Hùng King VII	Lang Liêu	1631 – 1432 BC, Khôn line(支坤)
Hùng Vĩ Vương (雄暐王) Hùng King VIII	Thừa Vân Lang	1431 – 1332 BC, Đoài line (支兌)
Hùng Định Vương( 雄定王), Hùng King IX	Quân Lang	1331 – 1252 BC, Giáp line (支甲)
Hùng Hi Vương (雄曦王), Hùng King X	Hùng Hải Lang	1251 – 1162 BC, Ất line (支乙)
Hùng Trinh Vương (雄楨王), Hùng King XI	Hưng Đức Lang	1161 – 1055 BC, Bính line (支丙)
Hùng Vũ Vương (雄武王), Hùng King XII	Đức Hiền Lang	1054 – 969 BC, Đinh line (支丁)
Hùng Việt Vương (雄越王), Hùng King XIII	Tuấn Lang	968 – 854 BC, Mậu line (支戊)
Hùng Anh Vương (雄英王), Hùng King XIV	Chân Nhân Lang	853 – 755 BC, Kỷ line (支己)
Hùng Triệu Vương (雄朝王), Hùng King XV	Cảnh Chiêu Lang	754 – 661 BC, Canh line (支庚)
Hùng Tạo Vương (雄造王), Hùng King XVI	Đức Quân Lang	660 – 569 BC, Tân line (支辛)
Hùng Nghị Vương (雄毅王), Hùng King XVII	Bảo Quân Lang	568 – 409 BC, Nhâm line (支壬)
Hùng Duệ Vương (雄睿王), Hùng King XVIII	Lý Văn Lang or Mai An Tiêm	408 – 258 BC, Quý line (支癸)

=== Thục dynasty (257–207 BC) ===
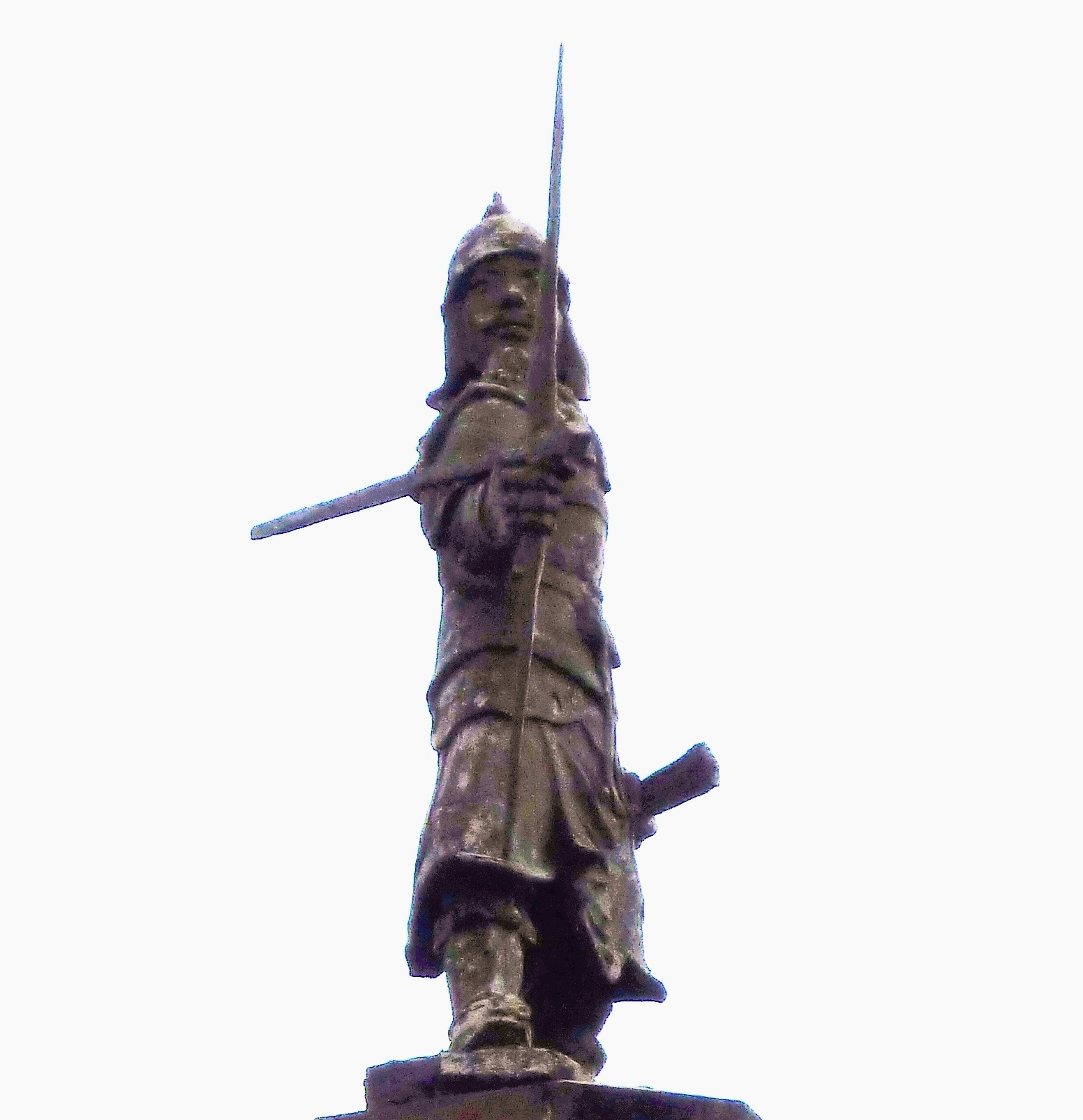
King	Image	Given name	Reign
An Dương Vương (安陽王)		Thục Phán (蜀泮)	257–207 BC

=== Triệu dynasty (204–111 BC) ===
There is still a debate about the status of the Triệu dynasty (Zhao dynasty): traditional Vietnamese historians considered the Triệu dynasty as a local Vietnamese dynasty while modern Vietnamese historians typically consider the Triệu dynasty as a Chinese dynasty.

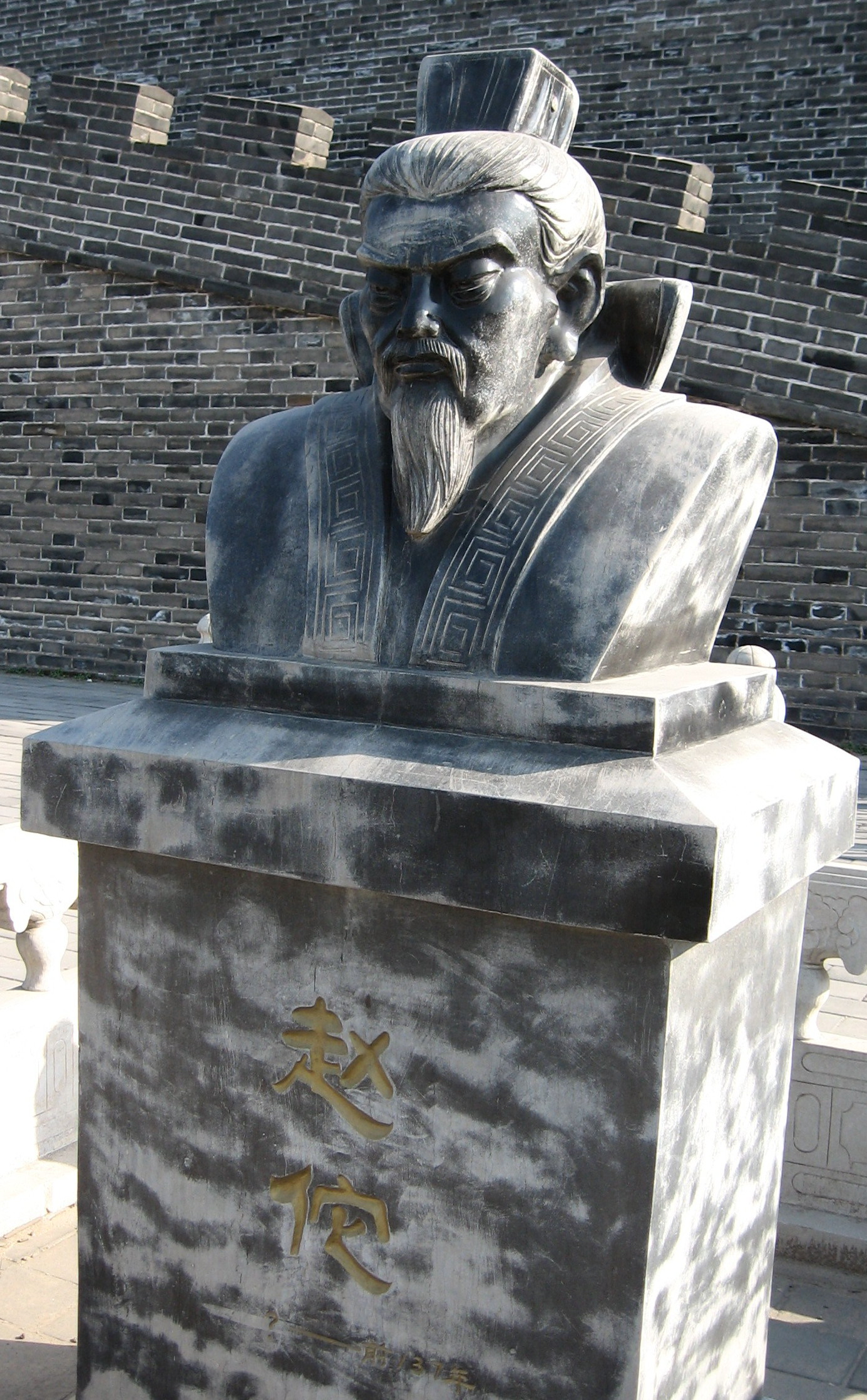
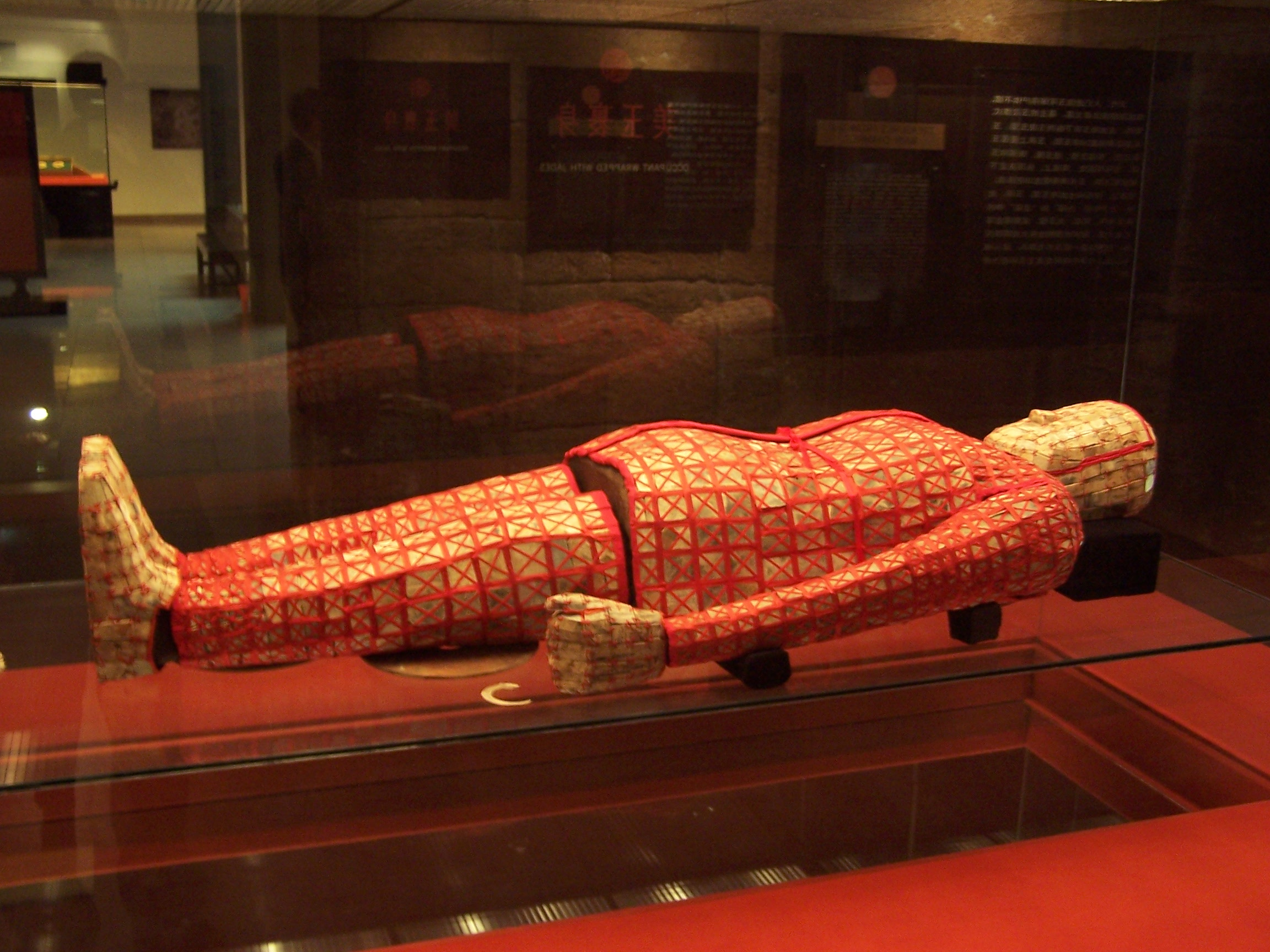
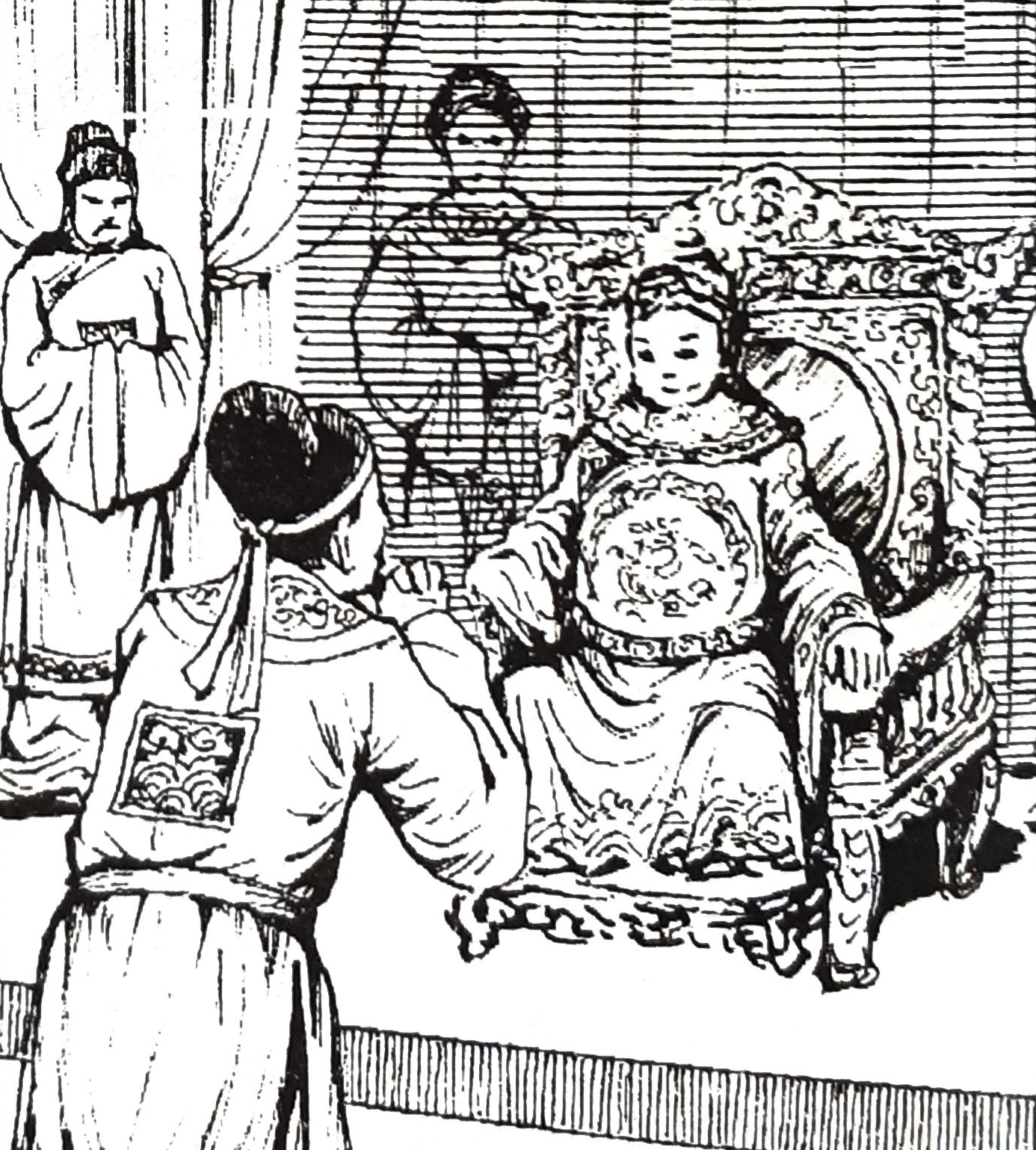
Emperor or king	Image	Given name	Reign
Triệu Vũ Đế (趙武帝)		Triệu Đà (趙佗)	204–137 BC
Triệu Văn Đế (趙文帝)		Triệu Mạt (趙眜)	137–125 BC
Triệu Minh Vương (趙明王)	no image	Triệu Anh Tề (趙嬰齊)	125–113 BC
Triệu Ai Vương (趙哀王)		Triệu Hưng (趙興)	113–112 BC
Triệu Thuật Dương Vương (趙術陽王)	no image	Triệu Kiến Đức (趙建德)	112–111 BC

== 1st, 2nd, 3rd Chinese domination period (111 BC – 939 AD) ==
		Trưng Sisters		Lady Triệu				Mai Hắc Đế
Triệu dynasty						Early Lý dynasty			Phùng Hưng		Autonomy	Independent time
111 BCE	40	43	246	249	544	602	722	766	789	906	938

=== Trưng Sisters (40–43) ===
Queen	Full name	Reign
Trưng Nữ Vương (徵女王)	Trưng Trắc (徵側)	40–43

=== Mai rebellions (713–723) ===
Emperor	Full name	Reign
Mai Hắc Đế (梅黑帝)	Mai Thúc Loan (梅叔鸞)	713–723
Mai Thiếu Đế (梅少帝)	Mai Thúc Huy (梅叔輝)	722–723
Mai Bạch Đầu Đế (梅白頭帝)	Mai Kỳ Sơn (梅奇山)	723 -724

=== Phùng rebellions (766–791) ===
King	Full name	Reign
Bố Cái Đại Vương (布蓋大王)	Phùng Hưng (馮興)	766–791
Phùng An (馮安)	Phùng An (馮安)	791–791

=== Early Lý dynasty (544–602) ===
Early Lý dynasty (544–602)
111 BC	544	602	938

Emperor	Full name	Reign
Lý Nam Đế (李南帝)	Lý Bôn (李賁)	544–548
Triệu Việt Vương (趙越王)	Triệu Quang Phục (趙光復)	548–571
Đào Lang Vương (桃郎王)	Lý Thiên Bảo (李天寶)	549–555
Hậu Lý Nam Đế (後李南帝)	Lý Phật Tử (李佛子)	571–603

Đào Lang Vương is not officially considered as emperor of Early Lý dynasty as he was a self-claimed emperor.

== Autonomous period (866–938) & Independent period (938–1407) ==
							Ming domination				Nam–Bắc triều * Bắc Hà–Nam Hà				French Indochina
Chinese domination	Ngô	Đinh	Early Lê	Lý	Trần	Hồ	Later Trần		Lê	Mạc	Revival Lê		Tây Sơn	Nguyễn		Modern time
											Trịnh lords
											Nguyễn lords
939			1009	1225	1400			1427	1527	1592		1788		1858	1945

=== Tĩnh Hải quân (866–938) ===
Khúc Family (905–938)
111 BC	905	938

Jiedushi	Full name	Reign
Khúc Tiên Chủ (曲先主)	Khúc Thừa Dụ (曲承裕)	905–907
Khúc Trung Chủ (曲中主)	Khúc Hạo (曲顥)	907–917
Khúc Hậu Chủ (曲後主)	Khúc Thừa Mỹ (曲承美)	917–930
Dương Đình Nghệ (楊廷藝)	Dương Đình Nghệ (楊廷藝)	930–937
Kiều Công Tiễn (矯公羡)	Kiều Công Tiễn (矯公羡)	937–938

At this time, the Khúc leaders still held the title of Jiedushi, hence they are not official kings of Vietnam.

=== Ngô dynasty (939–965) ===
Ngô dynasty (939–965)
939	965	1945

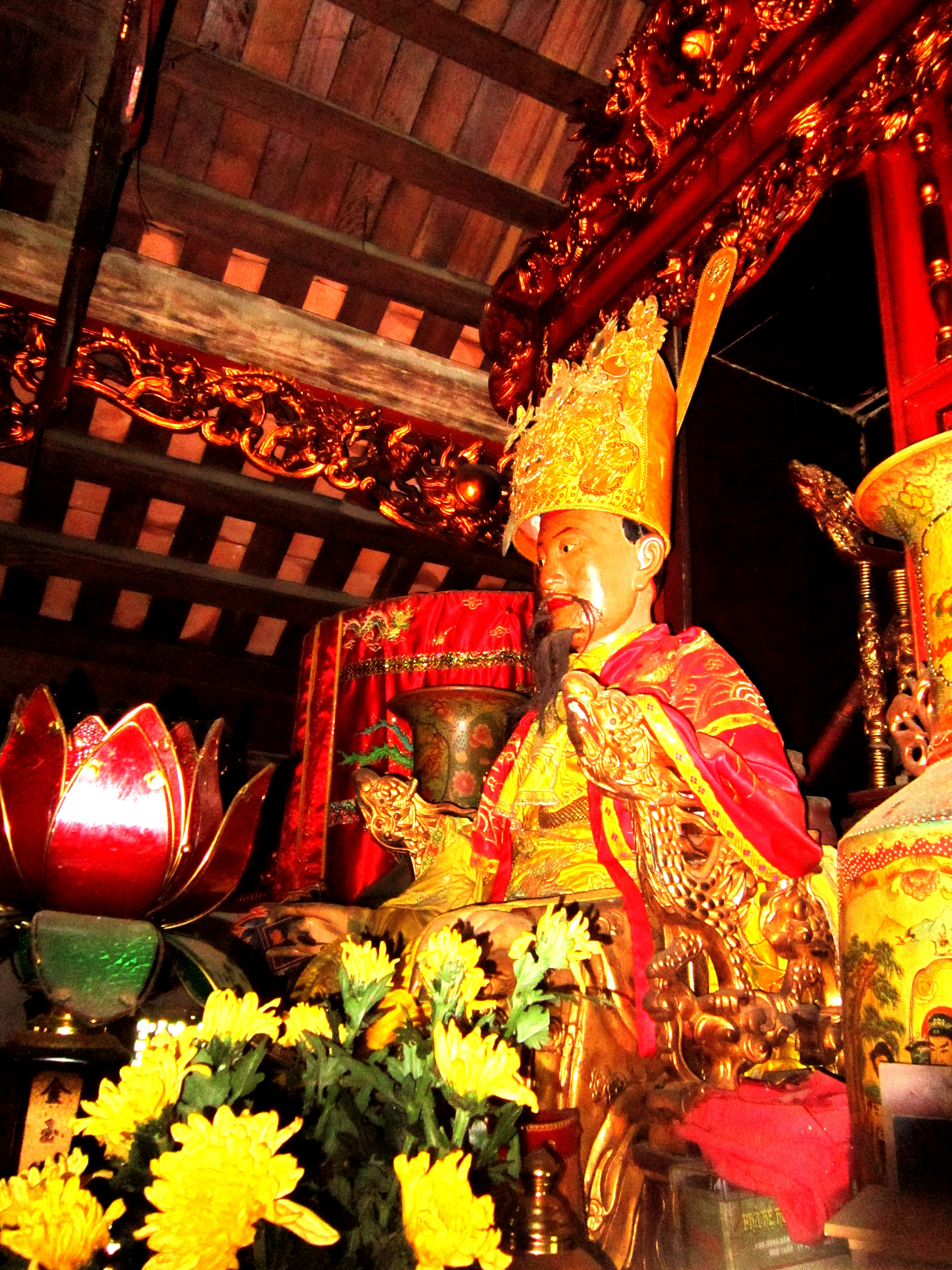
King	Image	Era name	Full name	Reign
Tiền Ngô Vương (前吳王)		none	Ngô Quyền (吳權)	939–944
Dương Bình Vương (楊平王)	no image	none	Dương Tam Kha (楊三哥)	944–950
Hậu Ngô Vương (後吳王)	no image	none	Ngô Xương Ngập (吳昌岌) and Ngô Xương Văn (吳昌文)	951–954; 950–965
Dương Tam Kha came from the Dương family.; Hậu Ngô Vương was the title of both Ngô Xương Ngập and Ngô Xương Văn who co-ruled the country.

== Interregnum (965–968) ==
=== Warring states period ===
The throne of Ngô dynasty was upsurged by Dương Tam Kha, the brother-in-law of Ngô Quyền and this led to anger among those who were loyal to Ngô dynasty. The local warlords decided to make the rebellions to claim the throne.

Anarchy of the 12 Warlords (965–968)
965	968	1945

Warlord	Lifespan	Real name	Description
Ngô Sứ Quân (吳使君)	?–968	Ngô Xương Xí (吳昌熾)	+ Grandson of Ngô Quyền and son of Ngô Xương Ngập and the legitimate heir of throne + Surrendered and pardoned in 968; End of Ngô dynasty
Ngô Lãm công (吳覽公) or Ngô An vương (吳安王)	?–979	Ngô Nhật Khánh (吳日慶)	+ Grandson of Ngô Quyền and son of Ngô Xương Văn + Surrendered and pardoned in 968; Deserted to Champa at the end of Đinh dynasty and died in 979
Đỗ Cảnh Công (杜景公)	912–967	Đỗ Cảnh Thạc (杜景碩)	+ Chinese ancestry from Jiangsu + General of Ngô Quyền and served in Battle of Bạch Đằng (938) + Injured by arrow-shooting and died in 967
Phạm Phòng Át (范防遏)	910–972	Phạm Bạch Hổ ( 范白虎)	+ General of Ngô Quyền and served in Battle of Bạch Đằng (938) + Surrendered and pardoned in 966 and promoted as general by Đinh Bộ Lĩnh
Long Kiều vương (隆橋王)	?–967	Kiều Công Hãn (矯公罕)	+ Grandson of Kiều Công Tiễn and served in Battle of Bạch Đằng (938) + Defeated and fled to Ngô Xương Xí's side and killed in 967.
Kiều Lệnh Công (隆令公)	?–?	Kiều Thuận (矯順)	+ Grandson of Kiều Công Tiễn and younger brother of Kiều Công Hãn + Defeated and killed .
Nguyễn Thái Bình (阮太平)	906–967	Nguyễn Khoan (阮寬)	+ Chinese ancestry + Oldest brother of Nguyễn Thủ Tiệp & Nguyễn Siêu + Surrendered and pardoned in 967 then become the monk .
Nguyễn Lệnh công (阮令公) or Vũ Ninh vương (武宁王)	908–967	Nguyễn Thủ Tiệp ( 阮守捷)	+ Chinese ancestry + Middle brother of Nguyễn Khoan & Nguyễn Siêu + Defeated and killed
Nguyễn Hữu Công (阮右公)	924–967	Nguyễn Siêu ( 阮超)	+ Chinese ancestry + Youngest brother of Nguyễn Khoan & Nguyễn Thủ Tiệp + Defeated and killed
Lý Lãng công (李郞公)	?–968	Lý Khuê (李奎)	+ Defeated and killed
Trần Minh Công (陳明公)	888–967	Trần Lãm (陳覧)	+ Chinese ancestry from Guangdong + Later alliance with Đinh Bộ Lĩnh and adopted him as his son + After he died, Đinh Bộ Lĩnh inherited the army of Lãm and fight the unification war with the other warlord
Lữ Tá công (呂佐公)	927–968	Lã Đường ( 呂唐)	+ Defeated and killed

== State of Đại Cồ Việt (968–1054) & State of Đại Việt (1054–1400, 1427–1804) ==
=== Đinh dynasty (968–980) ===
Đinh dynasty (968–980)
939	968	980	1945

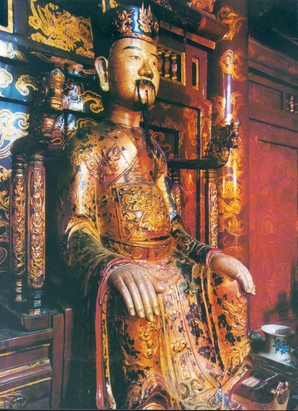
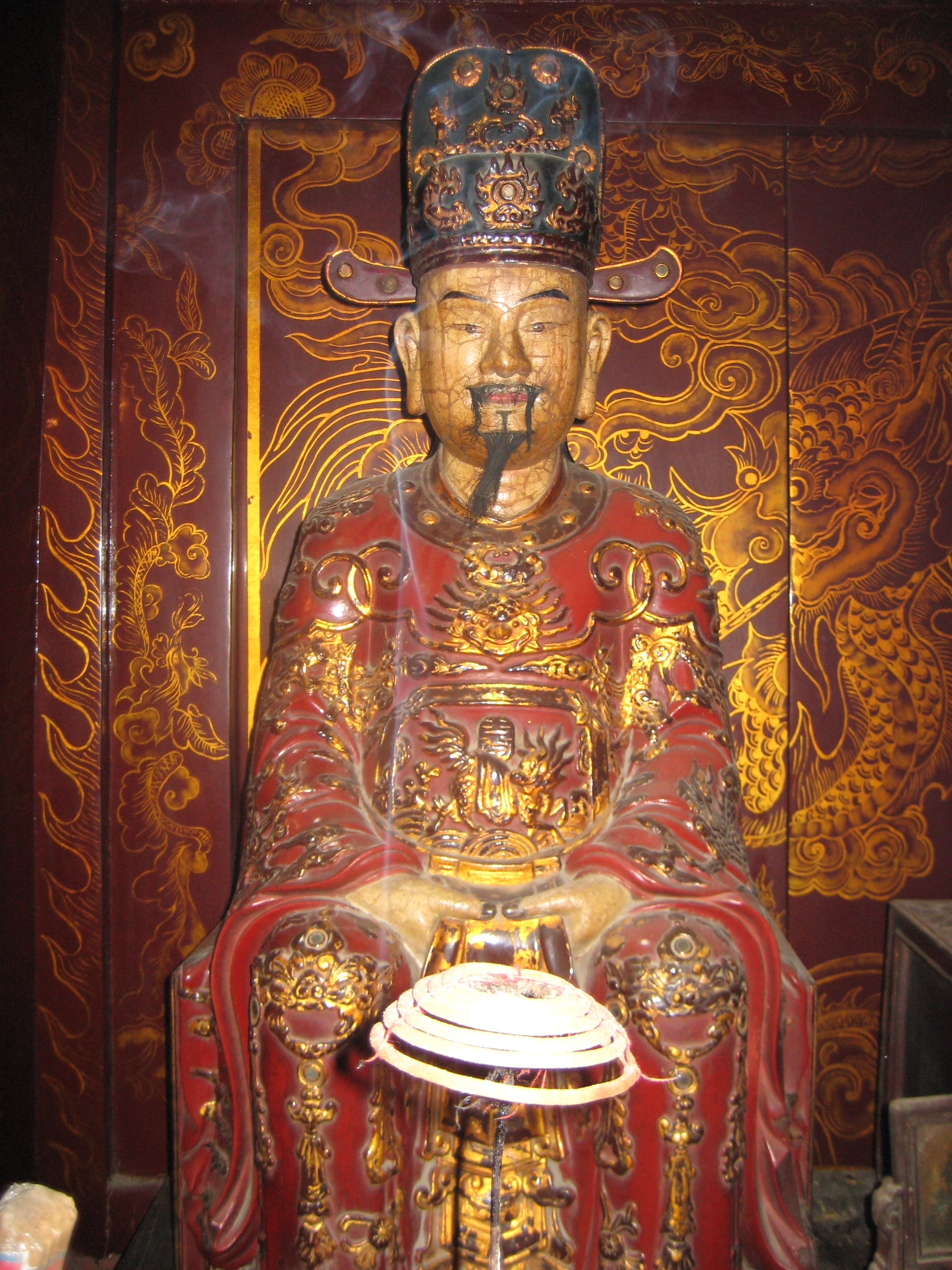
Emperor	Image	Era name	Full name	Reign
Đinh Tiên Hoàng (丁先皇)		Thái Bình (太平)	Đinh Bộ Lĩnh (Đinh Hoàn) (丁部領 / 丁環)	968–979
Đinh Phế Đế (丁廢帝)		Thái Bình (太平)	Đinh Toàn (Đinh Tuệ) (丁璿 / 丁穗)	979–980
Đinh Phế Đế continued to use his father's era name.

=== Early Lê dynasty (980–1009) ===
Early Lê dynasty (980–1009)
939	980	1009	1945

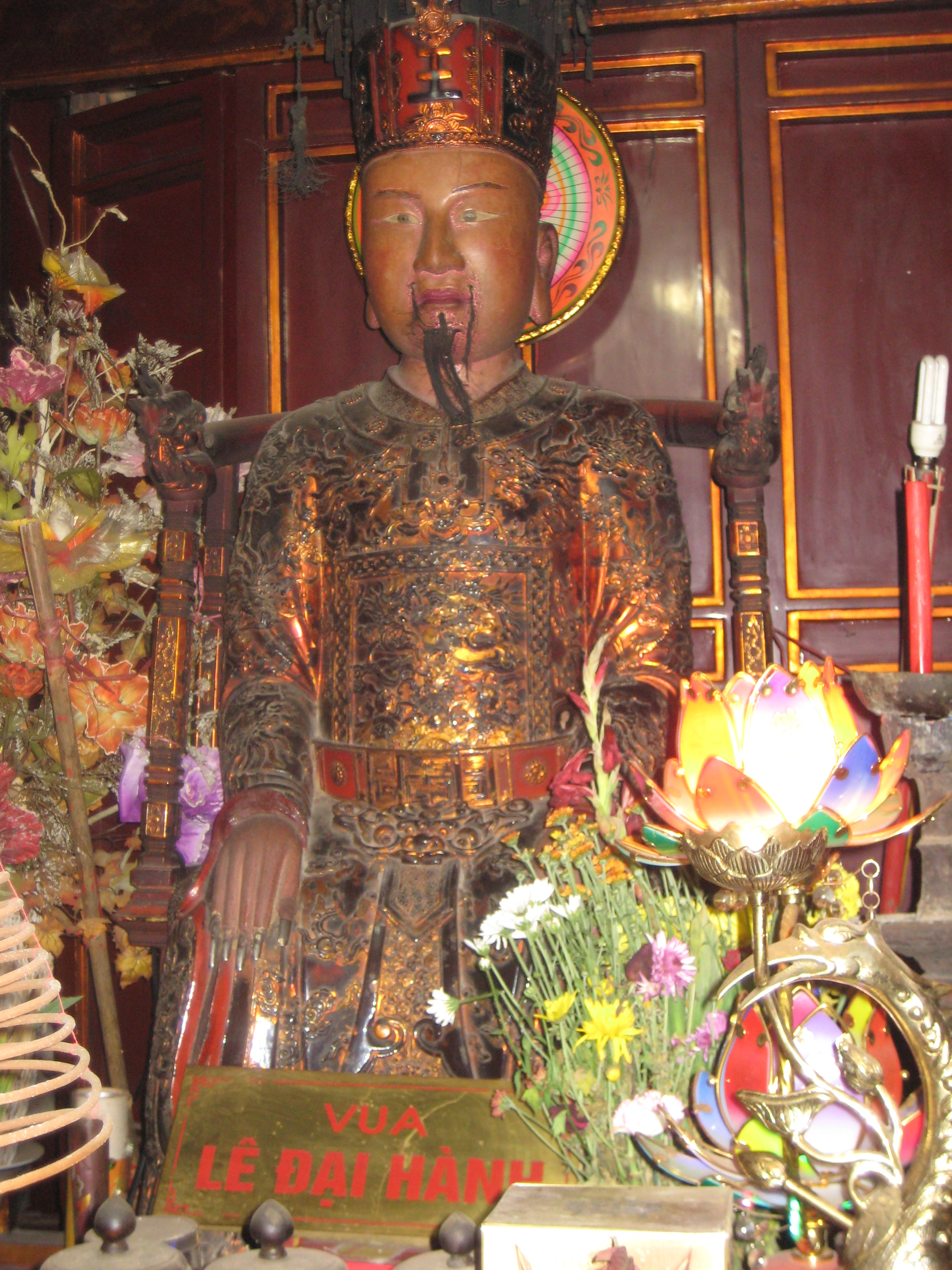
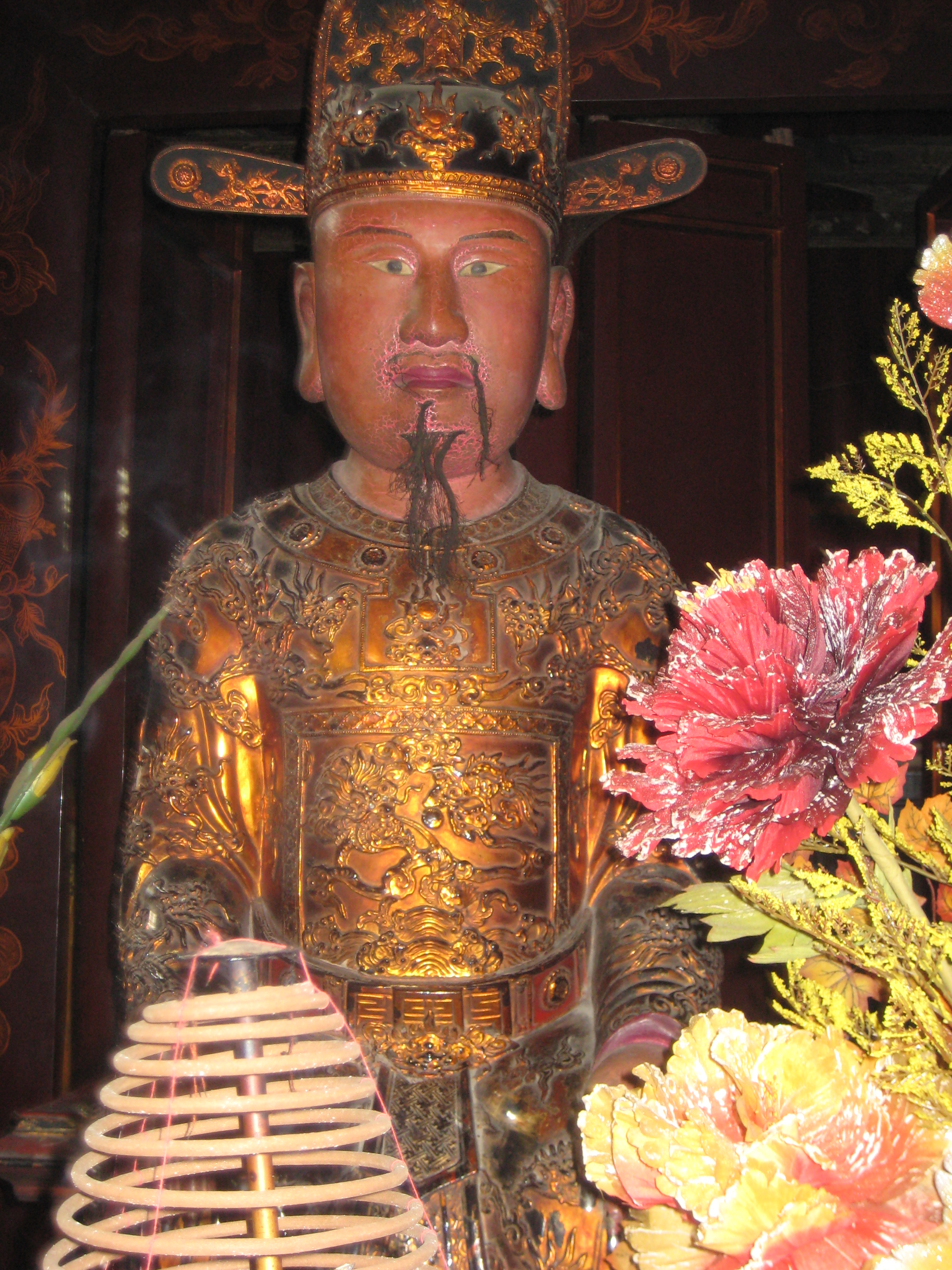
Emperor	Image	Era name	Full name	Reign
Lê Đại Hành (黎大行)		Thiên Phúc (天福); Hưng Thống (興統) (989–993); Ứng Thiên (應天) (994–1005)	Lê Hoàn (黎桓)	980–1005
Lê Trung Tông (黎中宗)	No image	none	Lê Long Việt (黎龍鉞)	1005 (3 days)
Lê Ngoạ Triều (黎臥朝)		Cảnh Thụy (景瑞) (1008–1009)	Lê Long Đĩnh (黎龍鋌)	1005–1009

=== Later Lý dynasty (1009–1225) ===
Later Lý dynasty (1009–1225)
939	1010	1225	1945

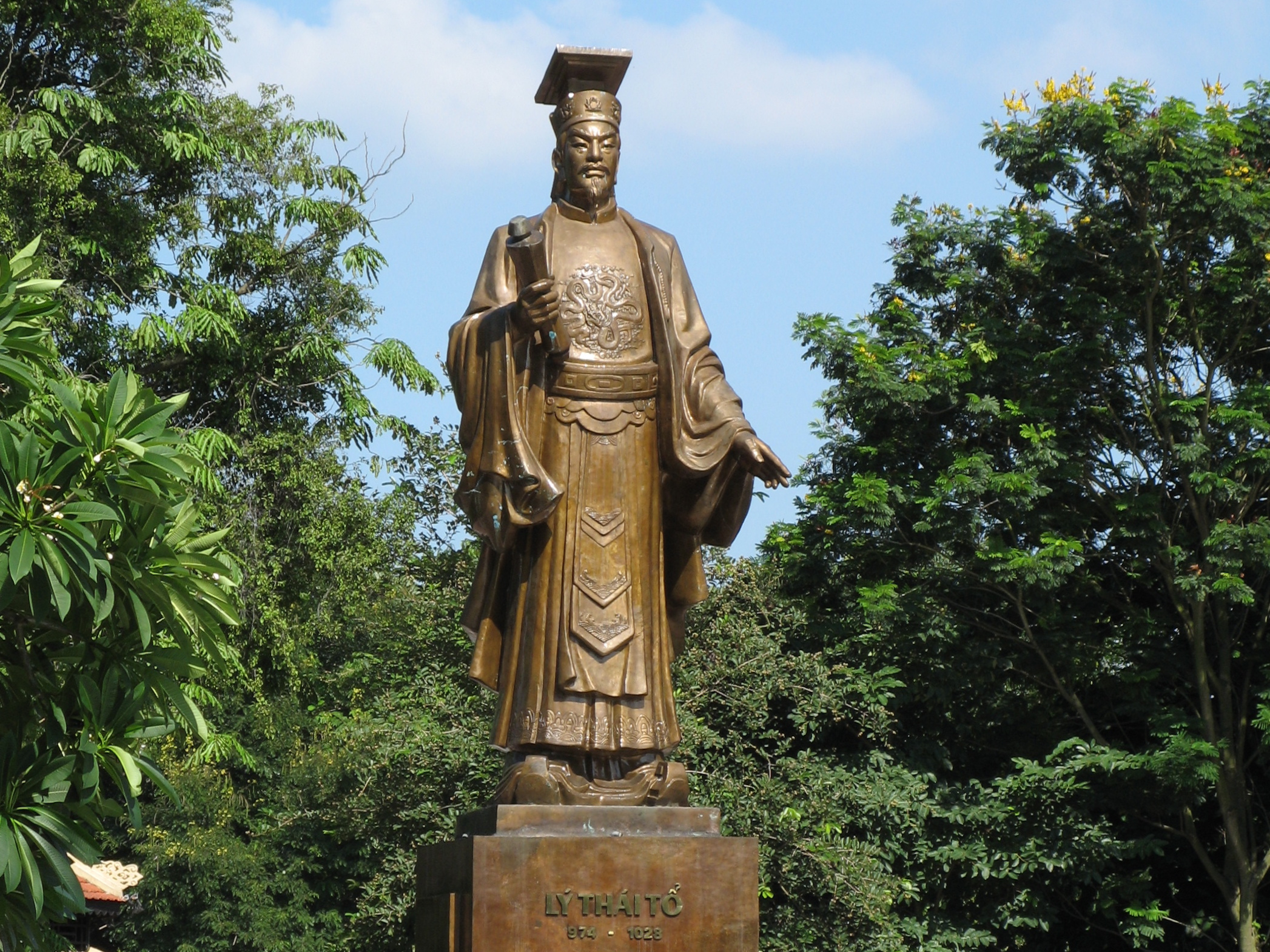
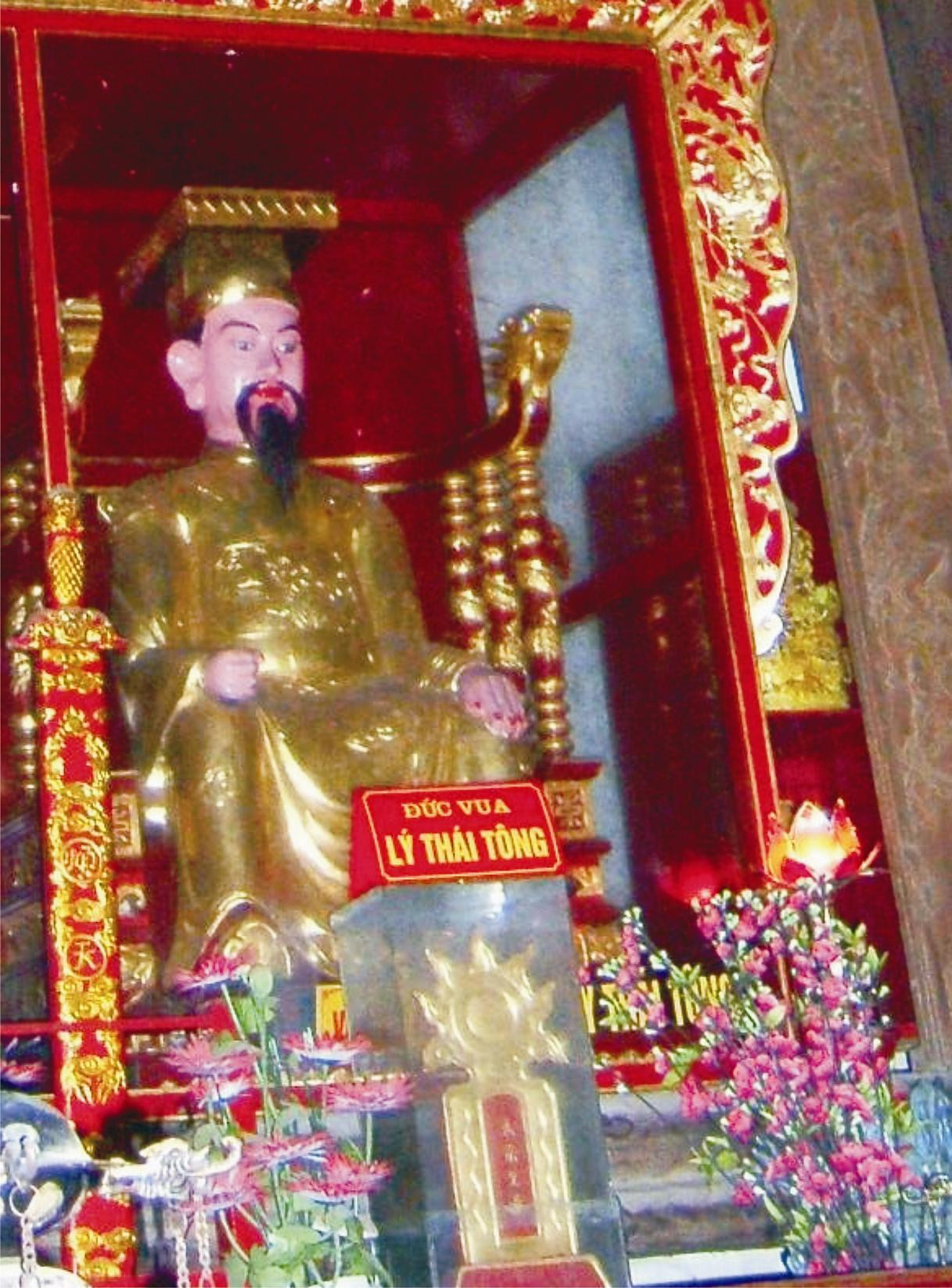
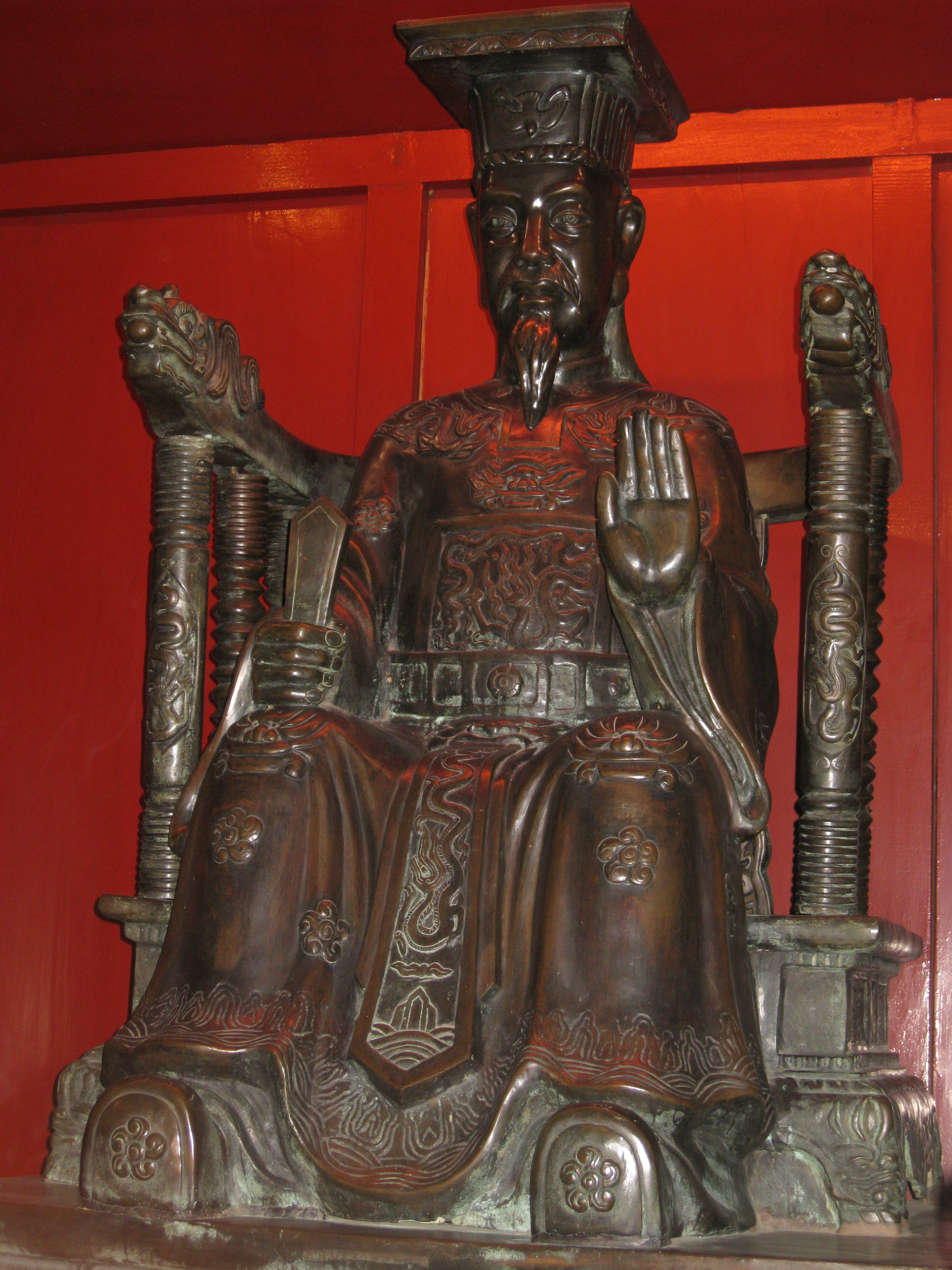
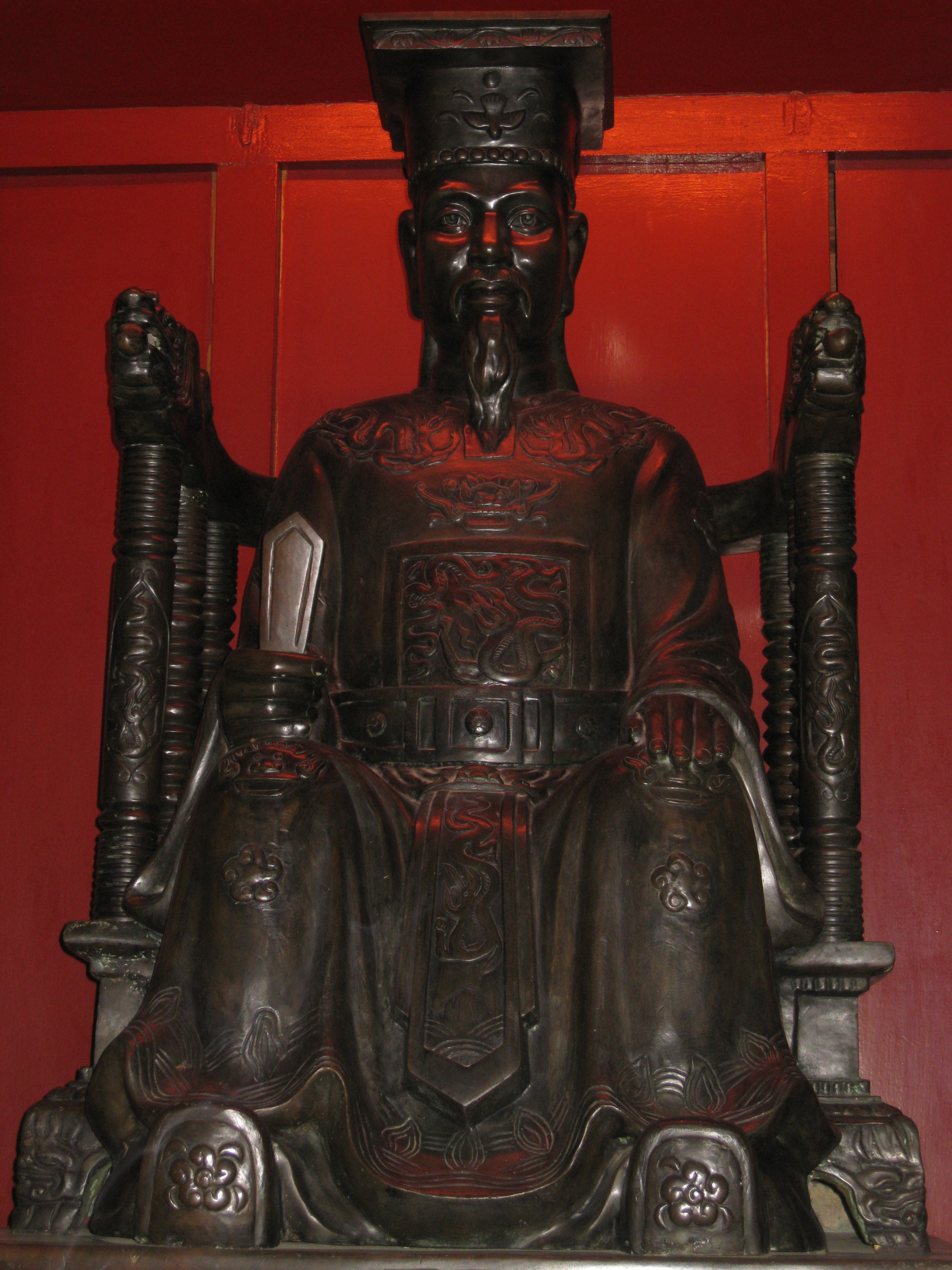
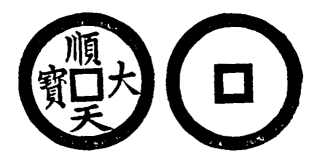
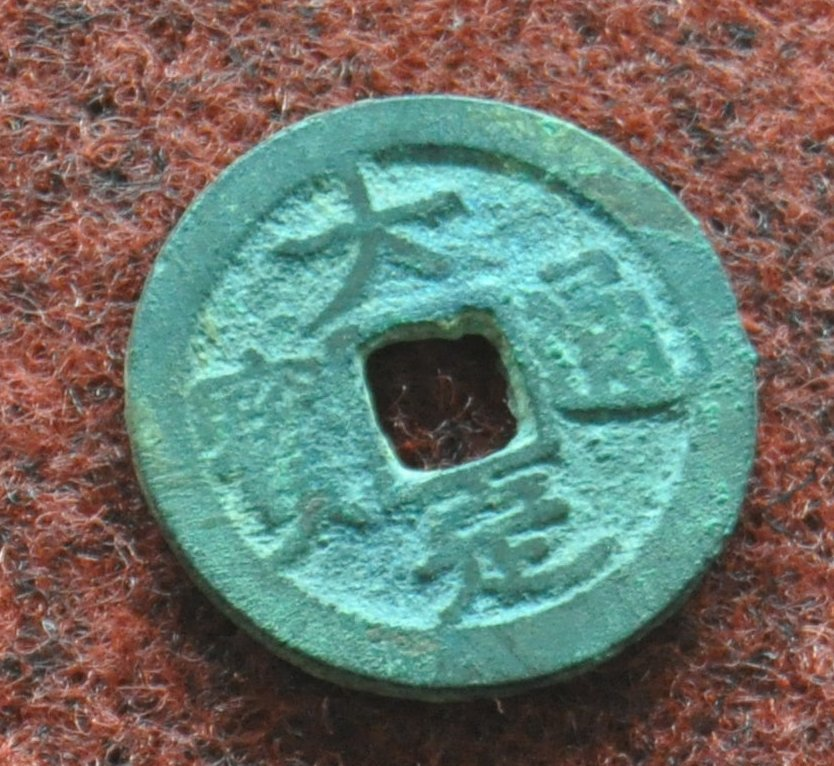
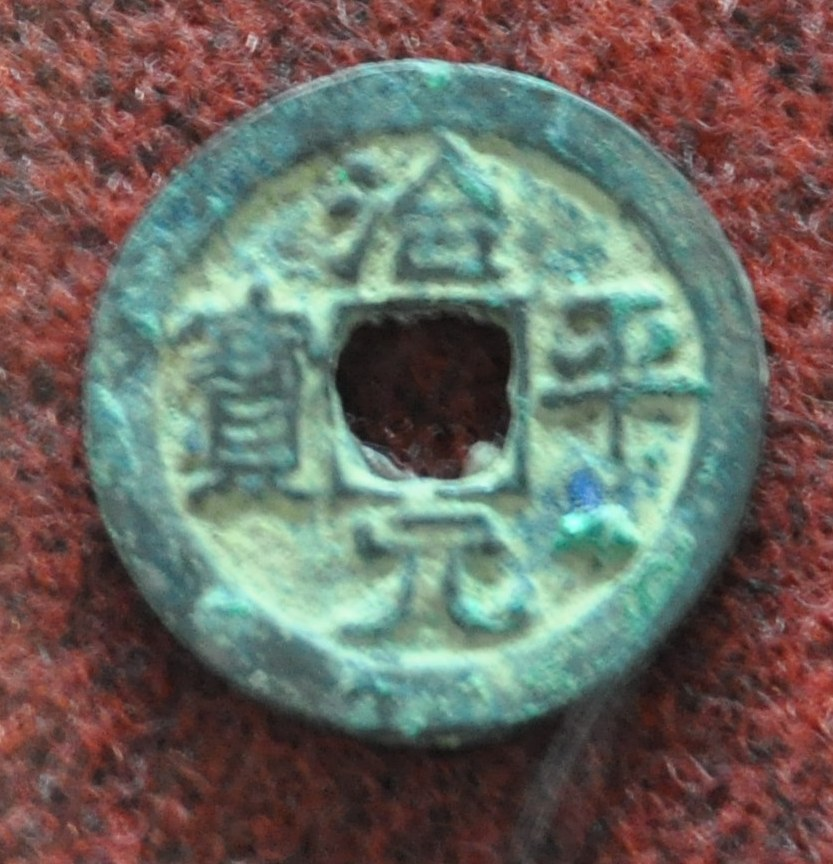
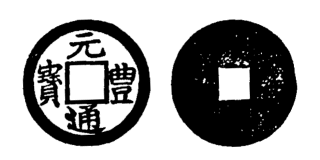
Emperor	image	Era name	Full name	Reign
Lý Thái Tổ (李太祖)		Thuận Thiên (順天)	Lý Công Uẩn (李公蘊)	1010–1028
Lý Thái Tông (李太宗)		Thiên Thành (天成) (1028–1033); Thông Thụy (通瑞) (1034–1038); Càn Phù Hữu Đạo (乾符有道) (1039–1041); Minh Đạo (明道) (1042–1043); Thiên Cảm Thánh Võ (天感聖武) (1044–1048); Sùng Hưng Đại Bảo (崇興大寶) (1049–1054)	Lý Phật Mã (李佛瑪)	1028–1054
Lý Thánh Tông (李聖宗)		Long Thụy Thái Bình (龍瑞太平) (1054–1058); Chương Thánh Gia Khánh (彰聖嘉慶) (1059–1065); Long Chương Thiên Tự (龍彰天嗣) (1066–1067); Thiên Huống Bảo Tượng (天貺寶象) (1068–1069); Thần Võ (神武) (1069–1072)	Lý Nhật Tôn (李日尊)	1054–1072
Lý Nhân Tông (李仁宗)		Thái Ninh (太寧) (1072–1075); Anh Võ Chiêu Thắng (英武昭勝) (1076–1084); Quảng Hữu (廣祐) (1085–1091); Hội Phong (會豐) (1092–1100); Long Phù (龍符) (1101–1109); Hội Tường Đại Khánh (會祥大慶) (1110–1119); Thiên Phù Duệ Võ (天符睿武) (1120–1126); Thiên Phù Khánh Thọ (天符慶壽) (1127)	Lý Càn Đức (李乾德)	1072–1127
Lý Thần Tông (李神宗)		Thiên Thuận (天順) (1128–1132); Thiên Chương Bảo Tự (天彰寶嗣) (1133–1137)	Lý Dương Hoán (李陽煥)	1128–1138
Lý Anh Tông (李英宗)		Thiệu Minh (紹明) (1138–1139); Đại Định (大定) (1140–1162); Chính Long Bảo Ứng (政隆寶應) (1163–1173); Thiên Cảm Chí Bảo (天感至寶) (1174–1175)	Lý Thiên Tộ (李天祚)	1138–1175
Lý Cao Tông (李高宗)		Trinh Phù (貞符) (1176–1185); Thiên Tư Gia Thụy (天資嘉瑞) (1186–1201); Thiên Gia Bảo Hữu (天嘉寶祐) (1202–1204); Trị Bình Long Ứng (治平龍應) (1205–1210)	Lý Long Trát (Lý Long Cán) (李龍翰)	1176–1210
Lý Thẩm (李忱)	no image	none	Lý Thẩm (李忱)	1209–1209
Lý Huệ Tông (李惠宗)	no image	Kiến Gia (建嘉)	Lý Sảm (李旵)	1211–1224
Lý Nguyên Vương (李元王)	no image	Càn Ninh (乾寧)	Lý Nguyên Vương (李元王)	1214–1216
Lý Chiêu Hoàng (李昭皇)		Thiên Chương Hữu Đạo (天彰有道)	Lý Phật Kim (Nguyễn Thiên Hinh) (李佛金)	1224–1225
The only empress in the history of Vietnam. Lý Thẩm and Lý Nguyên Vương were acceded and disposed shortly during chaos periods, hence not considered as official emperors of Later Lý dynasty.

=== Trần dynasty (1225–1400) ===
Trần dynasty (1225–1400)
939	1225	1400	1945

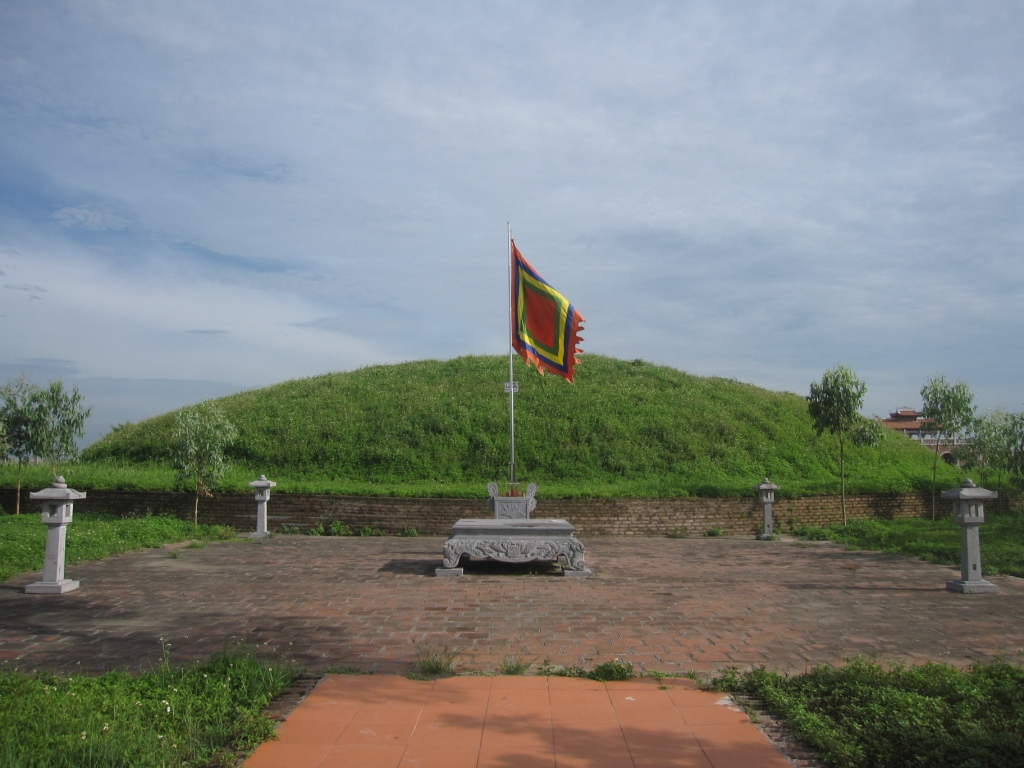
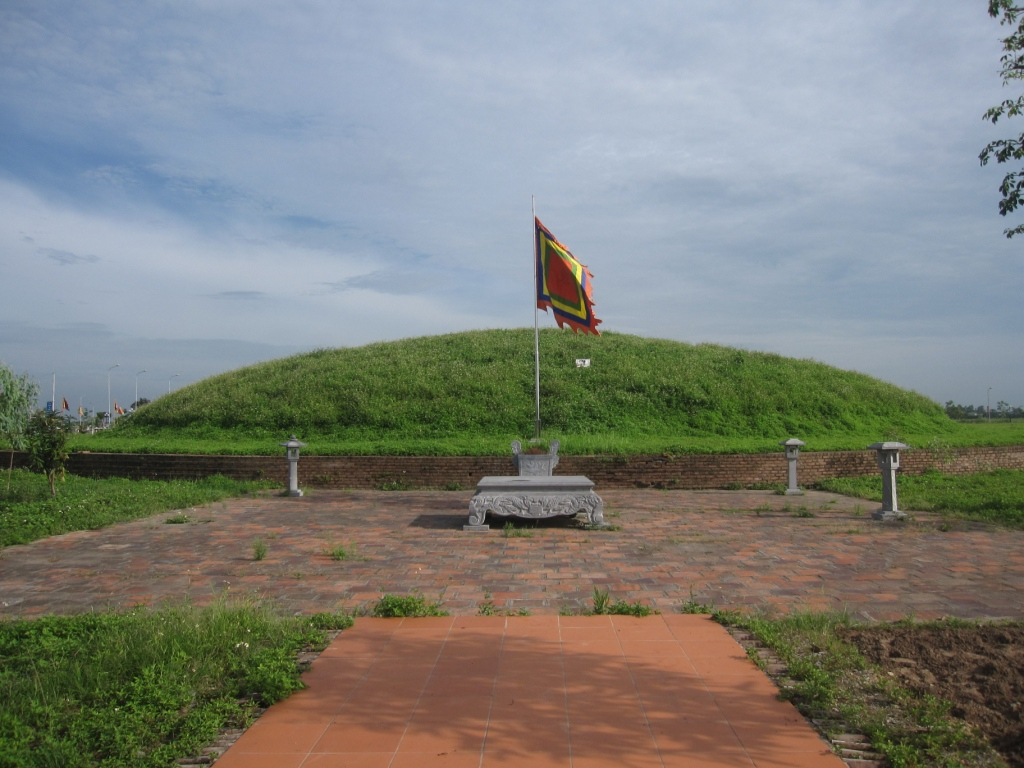
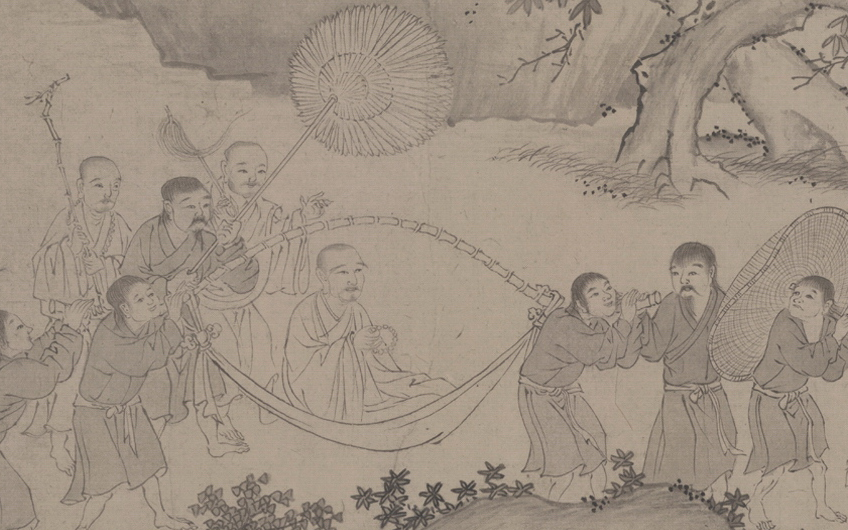
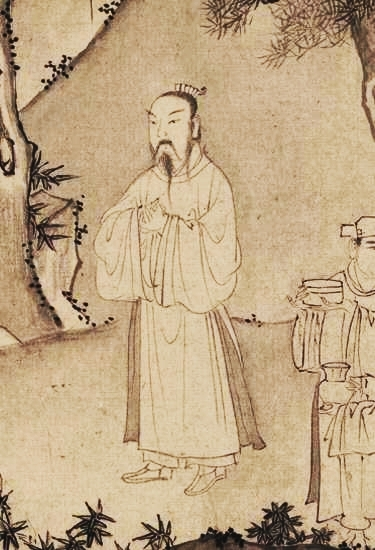
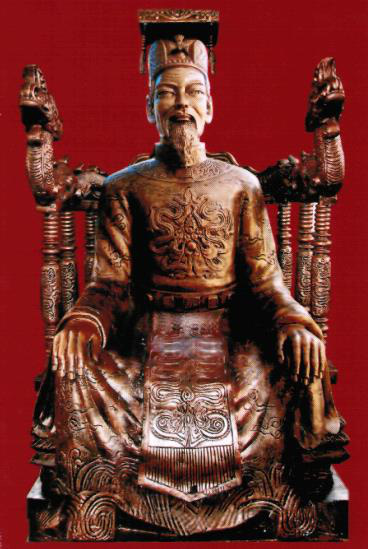
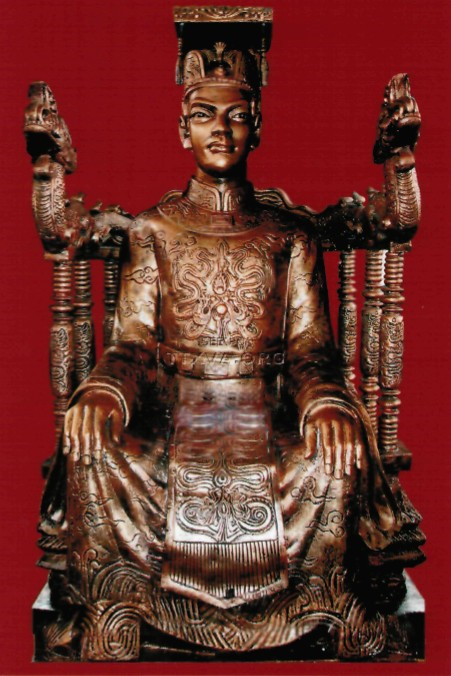
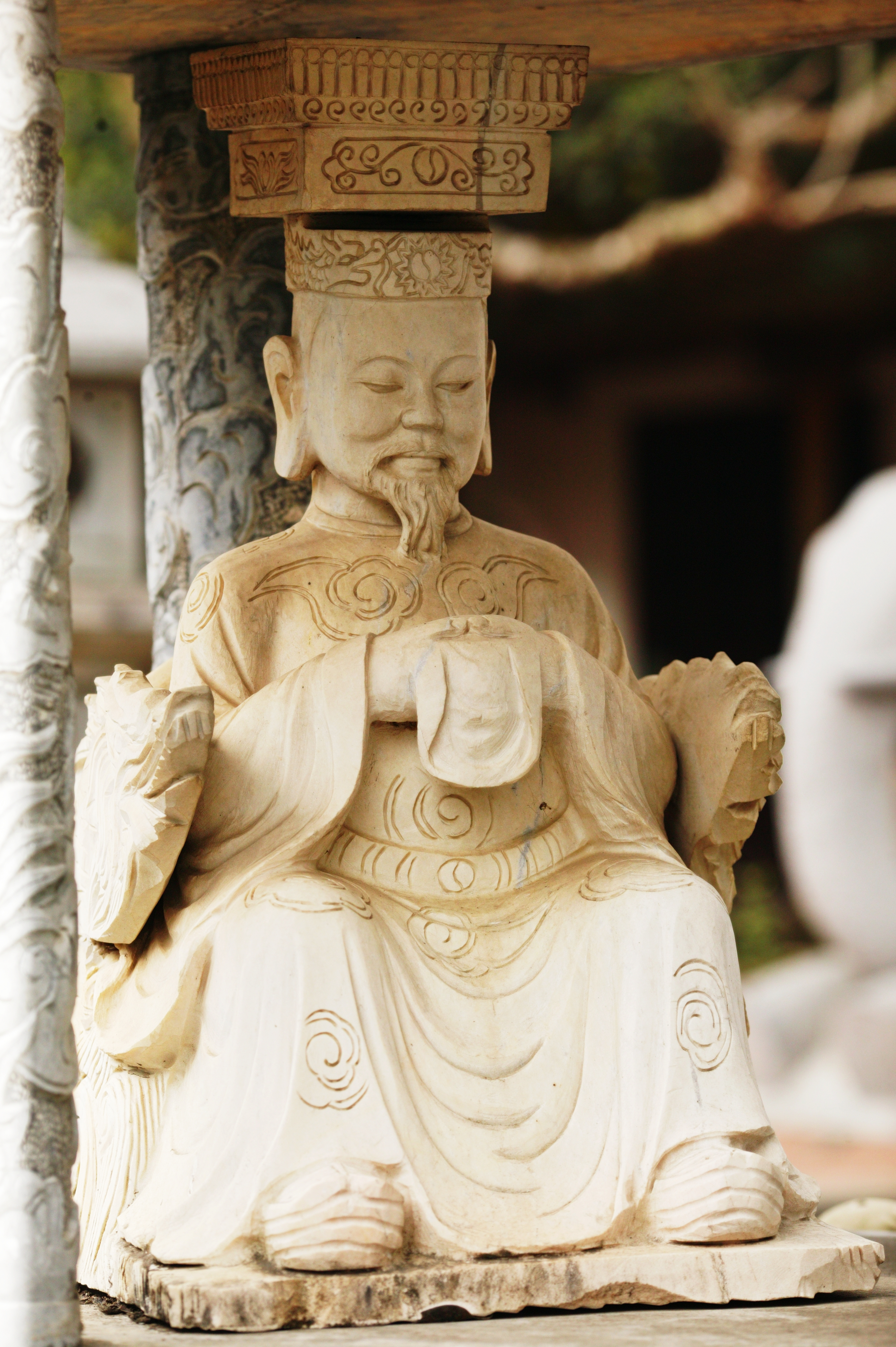
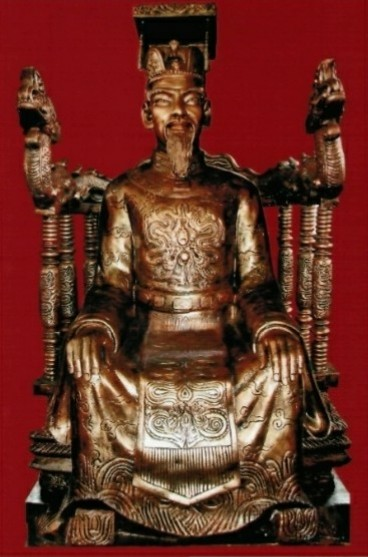
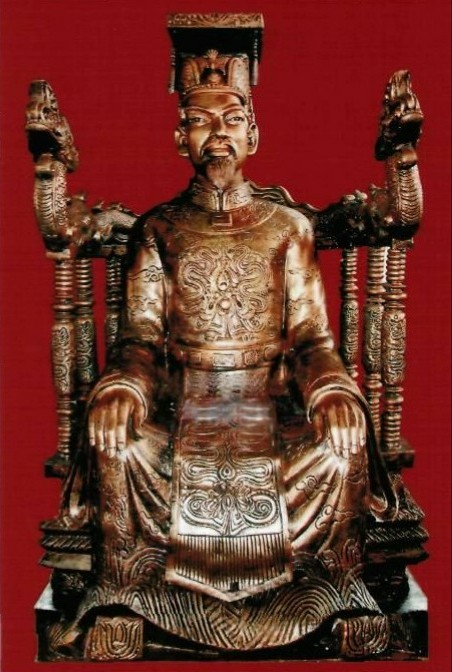
Emperor	Image	Era name	Full name	Reign
Trần Thái Tông (陳太宗)		Kiến Trung (建中) (1225–1237); Thiên Ứng Chính Bình (天應政平) (1238–1350); Nguyên Phong (元豐) (1251–1258)	Trần Cảnh (陳煚)	1225–1258
Trần Thánh Tông (陳聖宗)		Thiệu Long (紹隆) (1258–1272); Bảo Phù (寶符) (1273–1278)	Trần Hoảng (陳晃)	1258–1278
Trần Nhân Tông (陳仁宗)		Thiệu Bảo (紹寶) (1279–1284); Trùng Hưng (重興) (1285–1293)	Trầm Khâm (陳昑)	1279–1293
Trần Anh Tông (陳英宗)		Hưng Long (興隆)	Trần Thuyên (陳烇)	1293–1314
Trần Minh Tông (陳明宗)		Đại Khánh (大慶) (1314–1323); Khai Thái (開泰) (1324–1329)	Trần Mạnh (陳奣)	1314–1329
Trần Hiến Tông (陳憲宗)		Khai Hữu (開祐)	Trần Vượng (陳旺)	1329–1341
Trần Dụ Tông (陳裕宗)		Thiệu Phong (紹豐) (1341–1357); Đại Trị (大治) (1358–1369)	Trần Hạo (陳暭)	1341–1369
Hôn Đức Công (昏德公)	no image	Đại Định (大定)	Dương Nhật Lễ (楊日禮)	1369–1370
Trần Nghệ Tông (陳藝宗)		Thiệu Khánh (紹慶)	Trần Phủ (陳暊)	1370–1372
Trần Duệ Tông (陳睿宗)		Long Khánh (隆慶)	Trần Kính (陳曔)	1372–1377
Trần Phế Đế (陳廢帝)	no image	Xương Phù (昌符)	Trần Hiện (陳晛)	1377–1388
Trần Thuận Tông (陳順宗)	no image	Quang Thái (光泰)	Trần Ngung (陳顒)	1388–1398
Trần Thiếu Đế (陳少帝)	no image	Kiến Tân (建新)	Trần Án (陳𭴣)	1398–1400

== State of Đại Ngu (1400–1407) ==
=== Hồ dynasty (1400–1407) ===
Hồ dynasty (1400–1407)
939	1400	1407	1945

Emperor	Era name	Full name	Reign
Hồ Quý Ly (胡季犛)	Thánh Nguyên (聖元)	Hồ Quý Ly (胡季犛)	1400
Hồ Hán Thương (胡漢蒼)	Thiệu Thành (紹成) (1401–1402); Khai Đại (開大) (1403–1407)	Hồ Hán Thương (胡漢蒼)	1401–1407

== Fourth Chinese domination period (1407–1428) ==
=== Later Trần dynasty (1407–1414) ===
Later Trần dynasty (1407–1414)
939	1407	1413	1945

Emperor	Era name	Full name	Reign
Giản Định Đế (簡定帝)	Hưng Khánh (興慶)	Trần Ngỗi (陳頠)	1407–1409
Trùng Quang Đế (重光帝)	Trùng Quang (重光)	Trần Quý Khoáng (陳季擴)	1409–1414
Thiên Khánh Đế (天慶帝)	Thiên Khánh (天慶)	Trần Cảo (陳暠)	1426–1428
Trần Cảo was a peasant who was a puppet emperor established by Lê Lợi – leader of Lam Son uprising, hence not considered as an official emperor of Later Trần dynasty.

== Second independent period (1428–1802) ==
=== Later Lê dynasty – Early period (1428–1527) ===
Later Lê dynasty – Early period (1428–1527)
939	1428	1527	1945

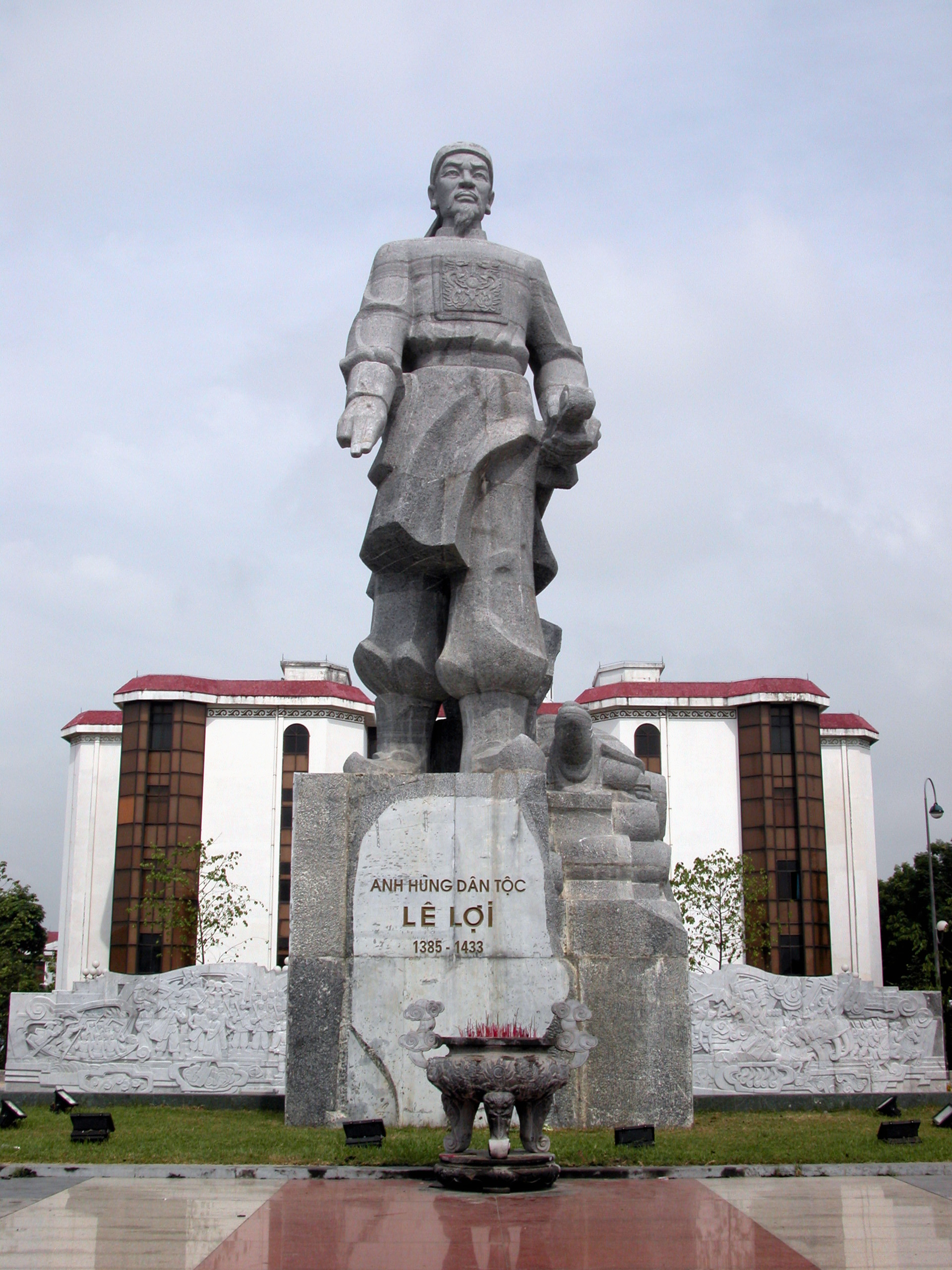
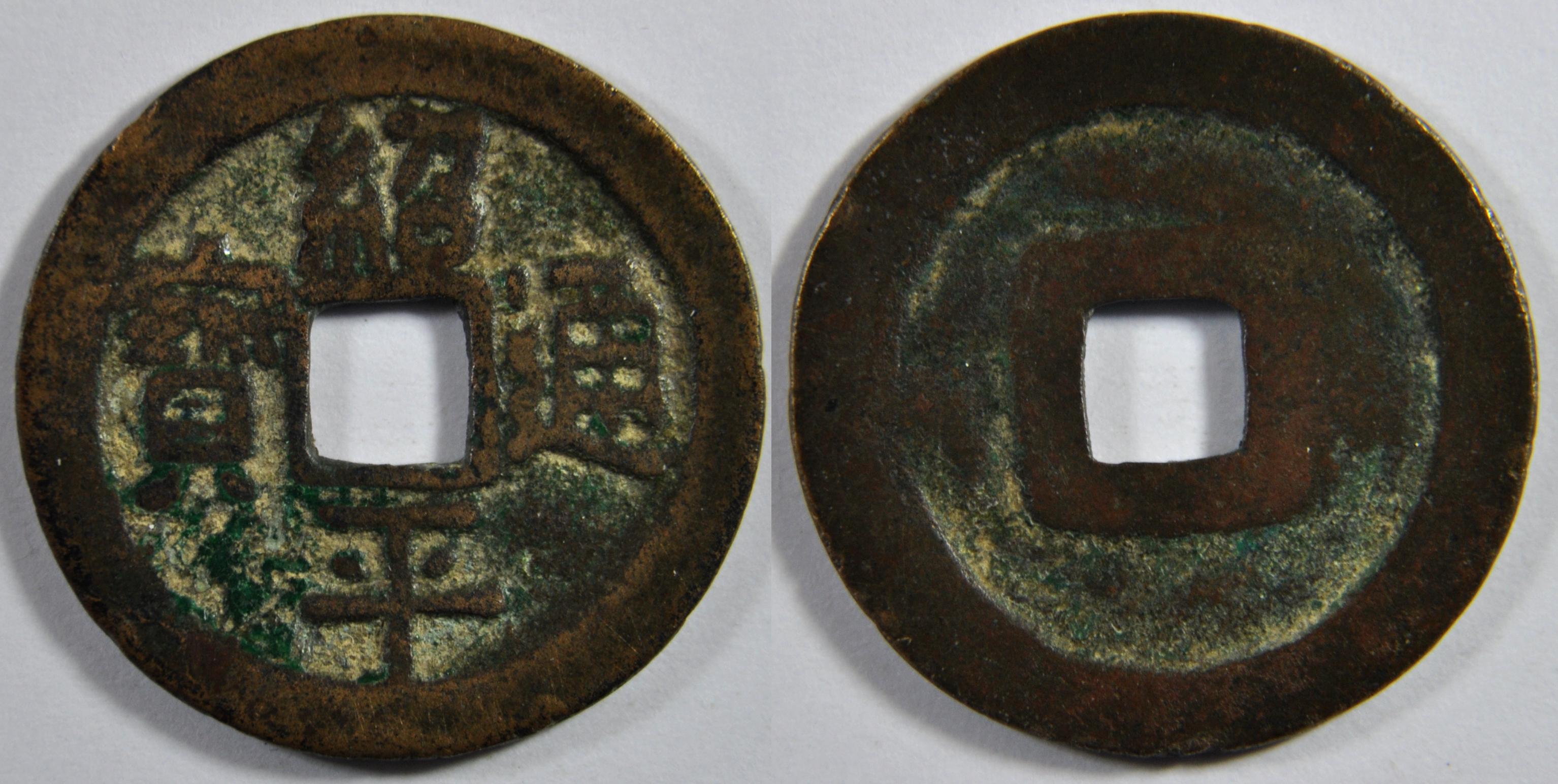
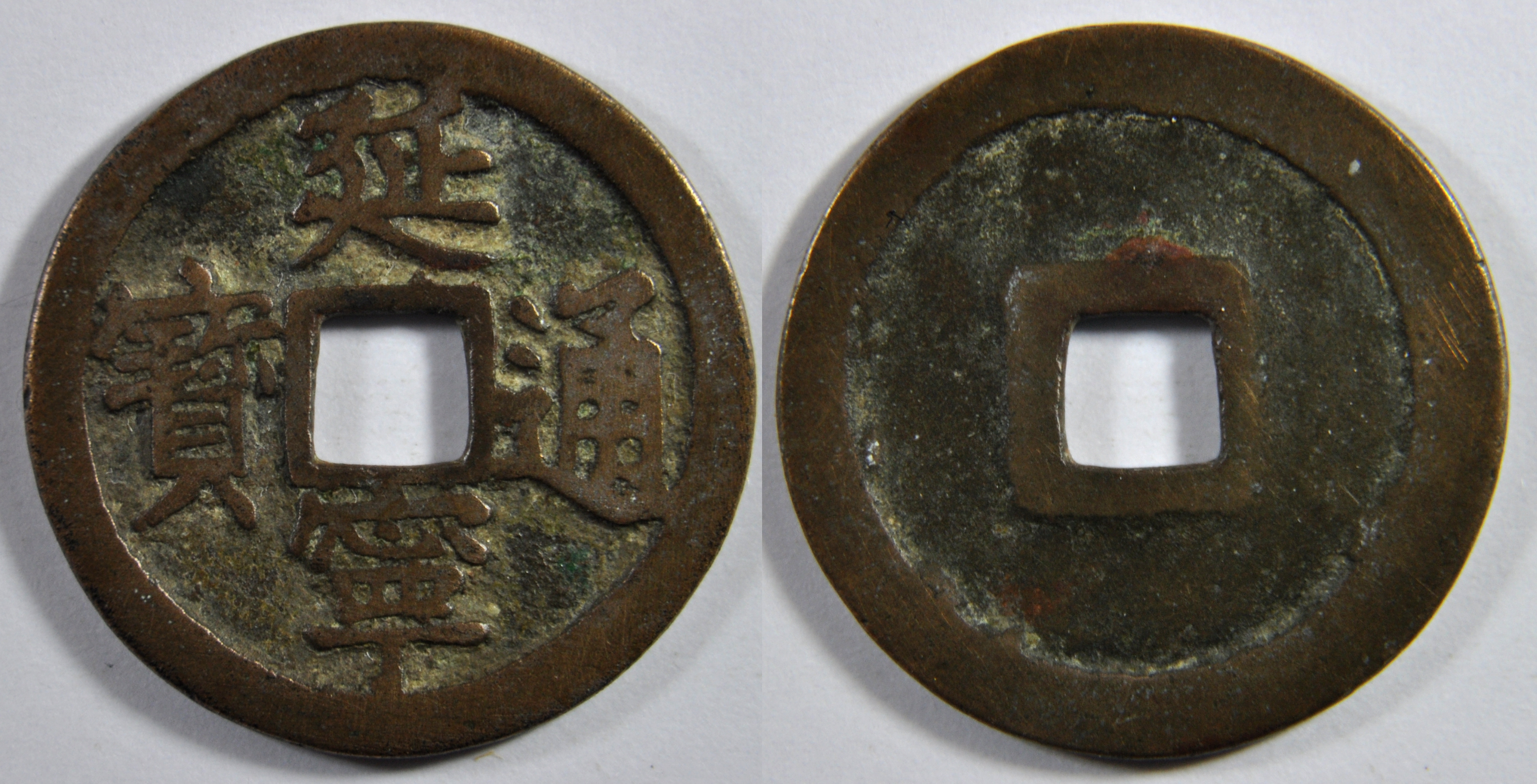
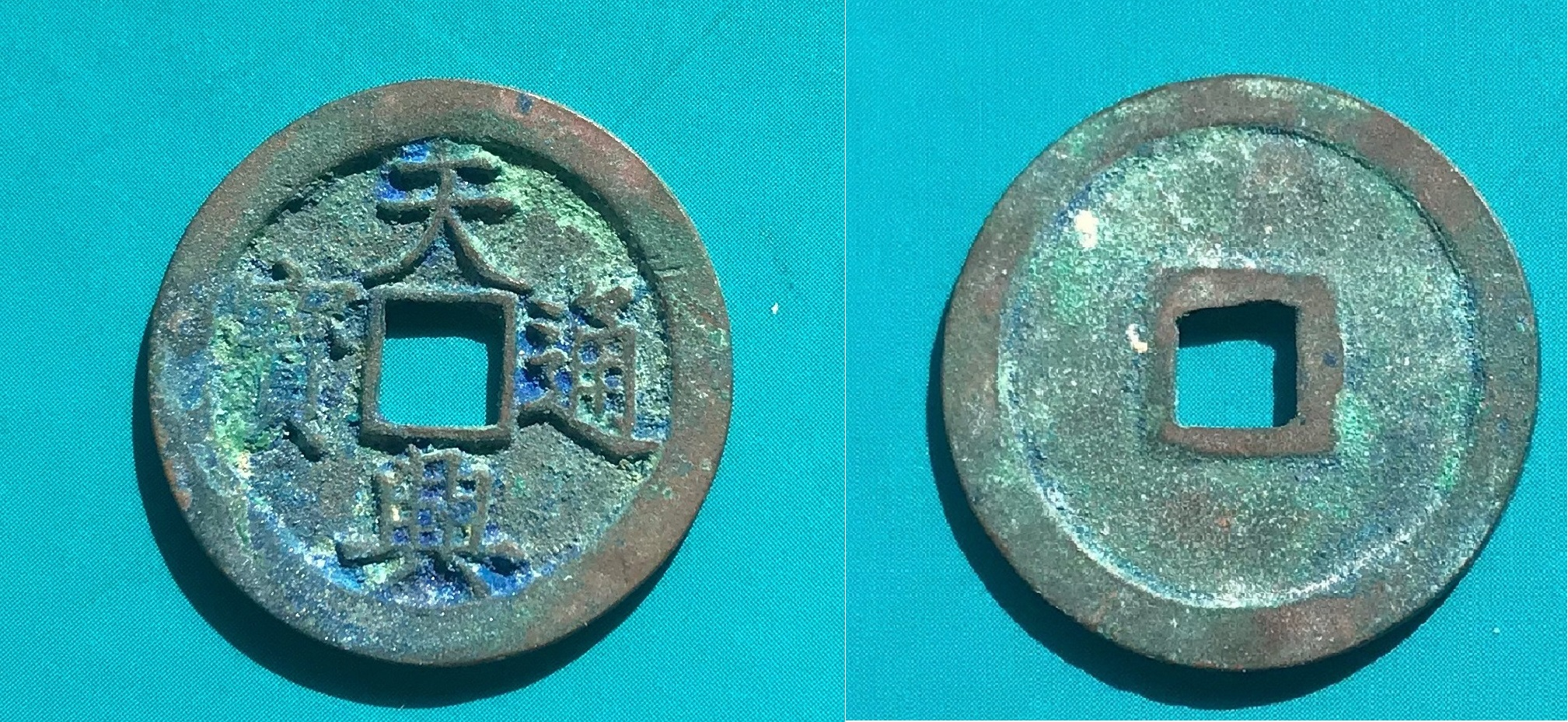
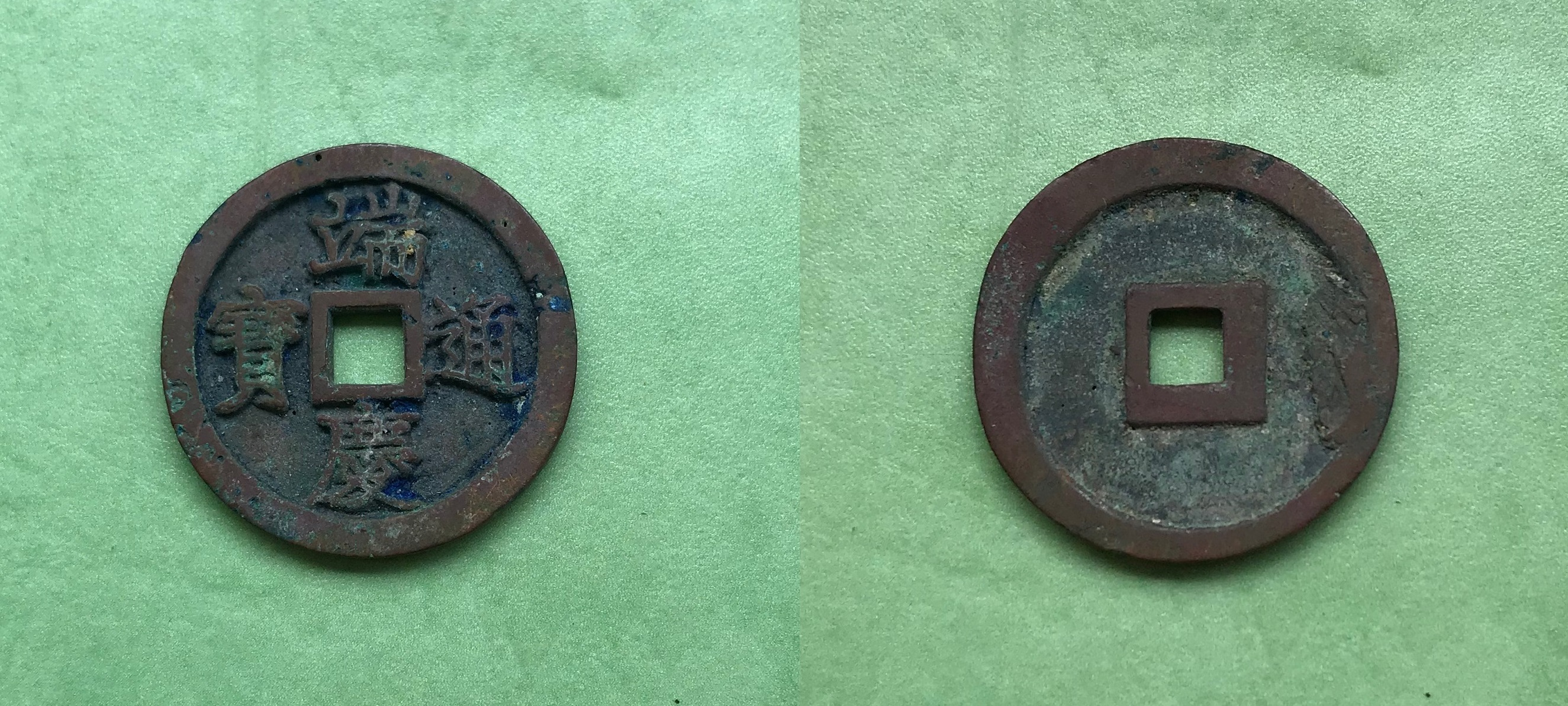
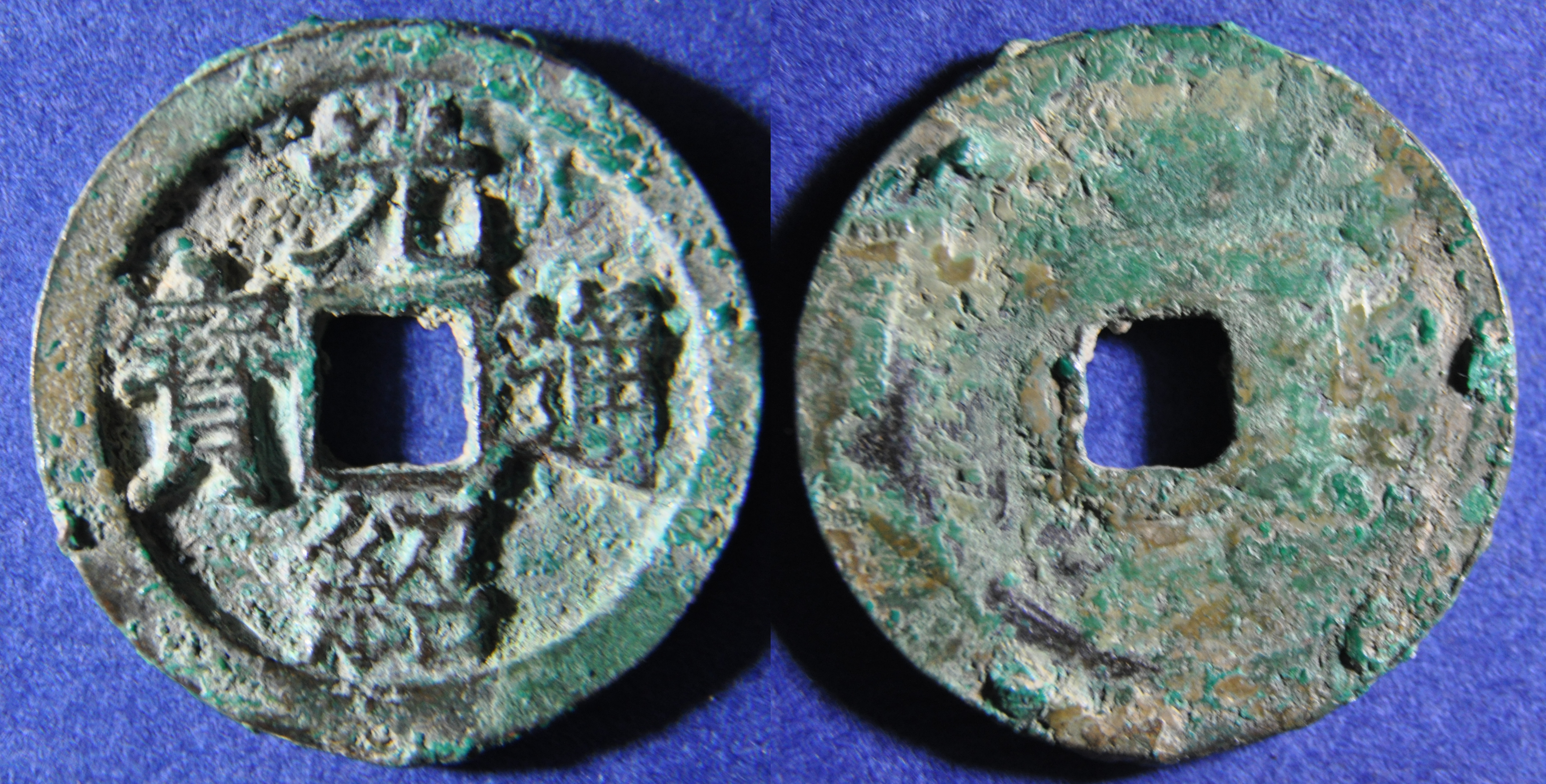
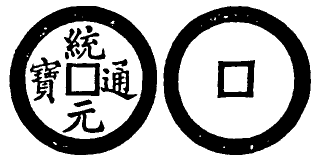
Emperor	Image	Era name	Full name	Reign
Lê Thái Tổ (黎太祖)		Thuận Thiên (順天)	Lê Lợi (黎利)	1428–1433
Lê Thái Tông (黎太宗)		Thiệu Bình (紹平) (1434–1440); Đại Bảo (大寶) (1440–1442)	Lê Nguyên Long (黎元龍)	1433–1442
Lê Nhân Tông (黎仁宗)		Đại Hòa/Thái Hòa (大和 / 太和) (1443–1453); Diên Ninh (延寧) (1454–1459)	Lê Bang Cơ (黎邦基)	1442–1459
Lệ Đức Hầu (厲德侯)		Thiên Hưng (天興) (1459–1460)	Lê Nghi Dân (黎宜民)	1459–1460
Lê Thánh Tông (黎聖宗)		Quang Thuận (光順) (1460–1469); Hồng Đức (洪德) (1470–1497)	Lê Tư Thành (Lê Hạo) (黎思誠 / 黎灝)	1460–1497
Lê Hiến Tông (黎憲宗)	no image	Cảnh Thống (景統)	Lê Tranh (黎鏳)	1497–1504
Lê Túc Tông (黎肅宗)	no image	Thái Trinh (泰貞)	Lê Thuần (黎㵮)	1504–1504
Lê Uy Mục (黎威穆)		Đoan Khánh (端慶)	Lê Tuấn (黎濬)	1505–1509
Lê Tương Dực (黎襄翼)	no image	Hồng Thuận (洪順)	Lê Oanh (黎瀠)	1510–1516
Lê Quang Trị (黎光治)	no image	none	Lê Quang Trị (黎光治)	1516–1516
Lê Chiêu Tông (黎昭宗)		Quang Thiệu (光紹)	Lê Y (黎椅)	1516–1522
Lê Bảng (黎榜)	no image	Đại Đức (大德)	Lê Bảng (黎榜)	1518–1519
Lê Do (黎槱)	no image	Thiên Hiến (天宪)	Lê Do (黎槱)	1519–1519
Lê Cung Hoàng (黎恭皇)		Thống Nguyên (統元)	Lê Xuân (黎椿)	1522–1527
Lê Quang Trị, Lê Bảng and Lê Do were acceded and disposed shortly in chaos periods, hence not considered as official emperors of Later Lê dynasty

=== Northern and Southern dynasty (1533–1592) ===
==== Northern dynasty – Mạc dynasty (1527–1592) ====
Mạc dynasty (1527–1592)
939	1527	1592	1945

Emperor	Era name	Full name	Reign
Mạc Thái Tổ (莫太祖)	Minh Đức (明德)	Mạc Đăng Dung (莫登庸)	1527–1529
Mạc Thái Tông (莫太宗)	Đại Chính (大正)	Mạc Đăng Doanh (莫登瀛)	1530–1540
Mạc Hiến Tông (莫憲宗)	Quãng Hòa (廣和)	Mạc Phúc Hải (莫福海)	1541–1546
Mạc Chính Trung (莫正中)	none	Mạc Chính Trung (莫正中)	1546–1547
Mạc Tuyên Tông (莫宣宗)	Vĩnh Định (永定) (1547); Cảnh Lịch (景曆) (1548–1553); Quang Bảo (光宝) (1554–1561)	Mạc Phúc Nguyên (莫福源)	1546–1561
Mạc Mậu Hợp (莫茂洽)	Thuần Phúc (淳福) (1562–1565); Sùng Khang (崇康) (1566–1577); Diên Thành (延成) (1578–1585); Đoan Thái (端泰) (1586–1587); Hưng Trị (興治) (1588–1590); Hồng Ninh (洪寧) (1591–1592)	Mạc Mậu Hợp (莫茂洽)	1562–1592
Mạc Toàn (莫全)	Vũ An (武安) (1592–1592)	Mạc Toàn (莫全)	1592
Mạc Chính Trung claimed himself as emperor of Mạc dynasty, however Mạc dynasty never considered him as official emperor. After internal fighting with his brothers, he fled to the Ming dynasty of China. After Mạc Toàn, Mạc family was defeated by Later Lê forces and fled to Cao Bằng. Mac family continued to rule there until 1677: Mạc Kính Chỉ (莫敬止) (1592–1593); Mạc Kính Cung (莫敬恭) (1593–1625); Mạc Kính Khoan (莫敬寬) (1623–1638); Mạc Kính Vũ (莫敬宇) (1638–1677)

==== Southern dynasty – Revival Lê dynasty – Warlord period (1533–1789) ====
Later Lê dynasty – Warlord period (1533–1788)
939	1533	1789	1945

Emperor	Era name	Full name	Reign
Lê Trang Tông (黎莊宗)	Nguyên Hòa (元和)	Lê Ninh (黎寧)	1533–1548
Lê Trung Tông (黎中宗)	Thuận Bình (順平)	Lê Huyên (黎暄)	1548–1556
Lê Anh Tông (黎英宗)	Thiên Hữu (天祐) (1557); Chính Trị (正治) (1558–1571); Hồng Phúc (洪福) (1572–1573)	Lê Duy Bang (黎維邦)	1556–1573
Lê Thế Tông (黎世宗)	Gia Thái (嘉泰) (1573–1577); Quang Hưng (光興) (1578–1599)	Lê Duy Đàm (黎維潭)	1573–1599
Restoration – Conflict between the Trịnh and Nguyễn lords During this time, emperors of the Lê dynasty only ruled in name, it was the Trịnh Lords in Northern Vietnam and Nguyễn lords in Southern Vietnam who held the real power.
Lê Kính Tông (黎敬宗)	Thận Đức (慎德) (1600); Hoằng Định (弘定) (1601–1619)	Lê Duy Tân (黎維新)	1600–1619
Lê Thần Tông (黎神宗) (first reign)	Vĩnh Tộ (永祚) (1620–1628); Đức Long (德隆) (1629–1643); Dương Hòa (陽和) (1635–1643)	Lê Duy Kỳ (黎維祺)	1619–1643
Lê Chân Tông (黎真宗)	Phúc Thái (福泰)	Lê Duy Hựu (黎維祐)	1643–1649
Lê Thần Tông (黎神宗) (second reign)	Khánh Đức (慶德) (1649–1652); Thịnh Đức (盛德) (1653–1657); Vĩnh Thọ (永壽) (1658–1661); Vạn Khánh (萬慶) (1662)	Lê Duy Kỳ (黎維祺)	1649–1662
Lê Huyền Tông (黎玄宗)	Cảnh Trị (景治)	Lê Duy Vũ (黎維禑)	1663–1671
Lê Gia Tông (黎嘉宗)	Dương Đức (陽德) (1672–1773); Đức Nguyên (德元) (1674–1675)	Lê Duy Cối (黎維禬)	1672–1675
Lê Hy Tông (黎熙宗)	Vĩnh Trị (永治) (1678–1680); Chính Hòa (正和) (1680–1705)	Lê Duy Hợp (黎維祫)	1676–1704
Lê Dụ Tông (黎裕宗)	Vĩnh Thịnh (永盛) (1706–1719); Bảo Thái (保泰) (1720–1729)	Lê Duy Đường (黎維禟)	1705–1728
Lê Duy Phường (黎維祊)	Vĩnh Khánh (永慶)	Lê Duy Phường (黎維祊)	1729–1732
Lê Thuần Tông (黎純宗)	Long Đức (龍德)	Lê Duy Tường (黎維祥)	1732–1735
Lê Ý Tông (黎懿宗)	Vĩnh Hữu (永佑)	Lê Duy Thận (黎維祳)	1735–1740
Lê Hiển Tông (黎顯宗)	Cảnh Hưng (景興)	Lê Duy Diêu (黎維祧)	1740–1786
Lê Chiêu Thống (黎昭統)	Chiêu Thống (昭統)	Lê Duy Khiêm (Lê Duy Kỳ) (黎維 / 黎維祁)	1787–1789

==== Tonkin – Trịnh lords (1545–1787) ====
Trịnh Lords (1545–1787)
939	1545	1787	1945

Lord	Given name	Reign
Trịnh Kiểm (鄭檢)	Trịnh Kiểm (鄭檢)	1545–1570
Bình An Vương (平安王)	Trịnh Tùng (鄭松)	1570–1623
Thanh Đô Vương (清都王)	Trịnh Tráng (鄭梉)	1623–1657
Tây Định Vương (西定王)	Trịnh Tạc (鄭柞)	1657–1682
Định Nam Vương (定南王)	Trịnh Căn (鄭根)	1682–1709
An Đô Vương (安都王)	Trịnh Cương (鄭棡)	1709–1729
Uy Nam Vương (威南王)	Trịnh Giang (鄭杠)	1729–1740
Minh Đô Vương (明都王)	Trịnh Doanh (鄭楹)	1740–1767
Tĩnh Đô Vương (靖都王)	Trịnh Sâm (鄭森)	1767–1782
Điện Đô Vương (奠都王)	Trịnh Cán (鄭檊)	1782 (2 months)
Đoan Nam Vương (端南王)	Trịnh Khải (鄭楷)	1782–1786
Án Đô Vương (晏都王)	Trịnh Bồng (鄭槰)	1786–1787

Trịnh Kiểm never declared himself as Lord during his rule, his titles were posthumously given by his descendants. Hence he is not considered as an official Trịnh Lord.

==== Cochinchina – Nguyễn lords (1558–1777) ====
Nguyễn Lords (1558–1777)
939	1558	1802	1945

Lord	Full name	Reign
Chúa Tiên (主僊)	Nguyễn Hoàng (阮潢)	1558–1613
Chúa Sãi (主仕)	Nguyễn Phúc Nguyên (阮福源)	1613–1635
Chúa Thượng (主上)	Nguyễn Phúc Lan (阮福瀾)	1635–1648
Chúa Hiền (主賢)	Nguyễn Phúc Tần (阮福瀕)	1648–1687
Chúa Nghĩa (主義)	Nguyễn Phúc Thái (阮福溙)	1687–1691
Chúa Minh (主明)	Nguyễn Phúc Chu (阮福淍)	1691–1725
Chúa Ninh (主寧)	Nguyễn Phúc Trú (阮福澍)	1725–1738
Võ Vương (武王)	Nguyễn Phúc Khoát (阮福濶)	1738–1765
Định Vương (定王)	Nguyễn Phúc Thuần (阮福淳)	1765–1777
Tân Chính Vương (新政王)	Nguyễn Phúc Dương (阮福暘)	1776–1777

Nguyễn Phúc Dương was established by Tây Sơn leaders (Nguyễn Nhạc, Nguyễn Huệ and Nguyễn Lữ) as a puppet Nguyễn Lord for their political purpose during Tây Sơn uprising. Hence he is sometimes not considered as an official Nguyễn lord.

=== Tây Sơn dynasty (1778–1802) ===
Tây Sơn dynasty (1778–1802)
939	1778	1802	1945

Emperor	Era name	Full name	Reign
Thái Đức (泰德)	Thái Đức (泰德)	Nguyễn Nhạc (阮岳)	1778–1788
Quang Trung (光中)	Quang Trung (光中)	Nguyễn Huệ (阮惠)	1788–1792
Cảnh Thịnh (景盛)	Cảnh Thịnh (景盛); Bảo Hưng (寶興)	Nguyễn Quang Toản (阮光纘)	1792–1802

Nguyễn Nhạc dropped his emperor title in 1788 after his younger brother – Nguyễn Huệ – declared himself as Emperor.

== Empire of Dai Nam (1802–1883), Annam and Tonkin Protectorates (1883–1945), and Empire of Vietnam (1945) ==
=== Nguyễn dynasty (1802–1945) ===
Nguyễn dynasty (1802–1945)
939	1802	1945

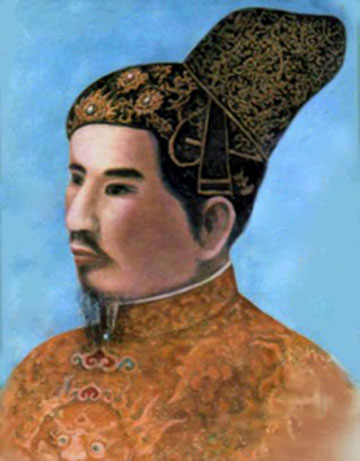
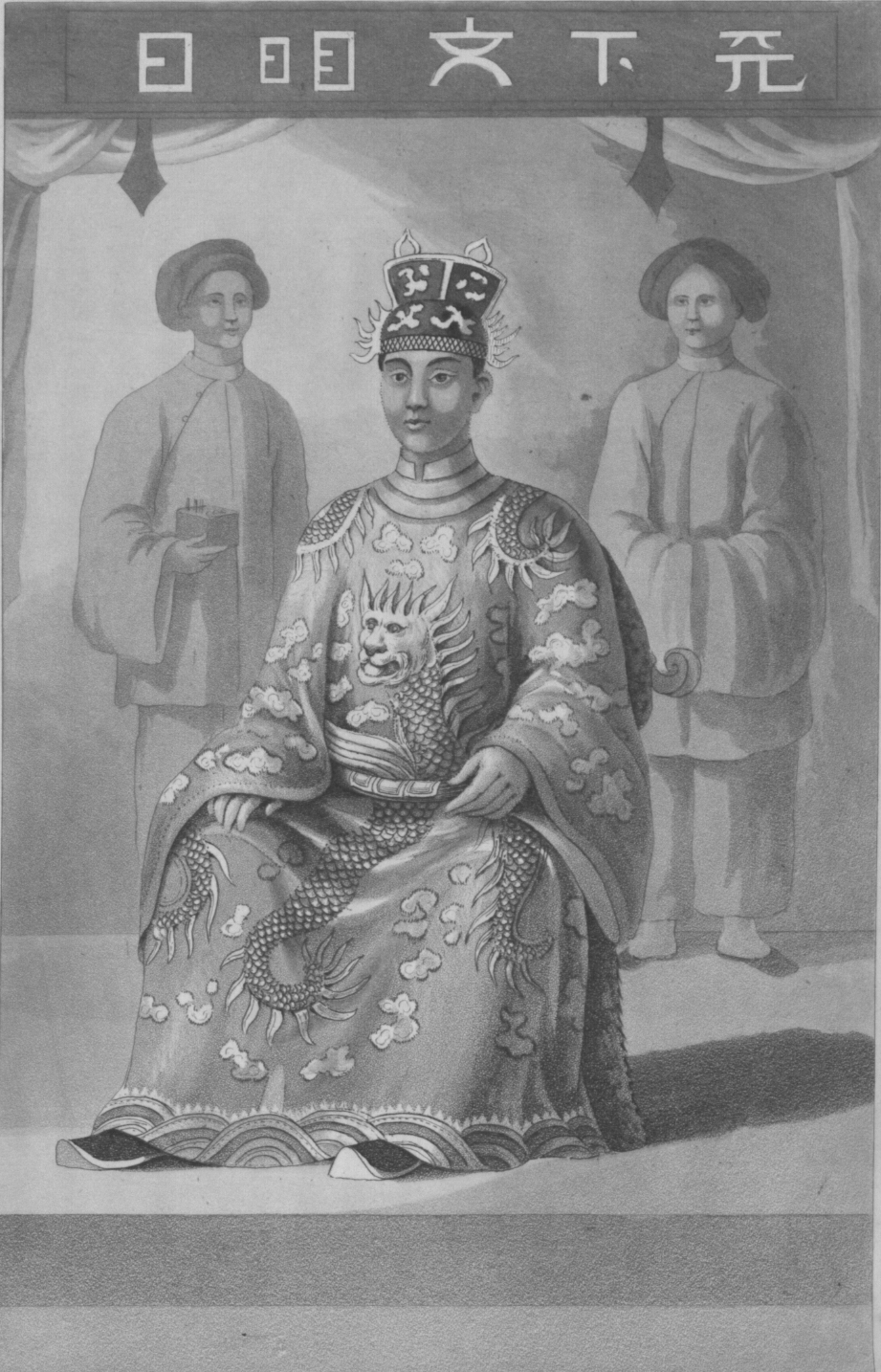
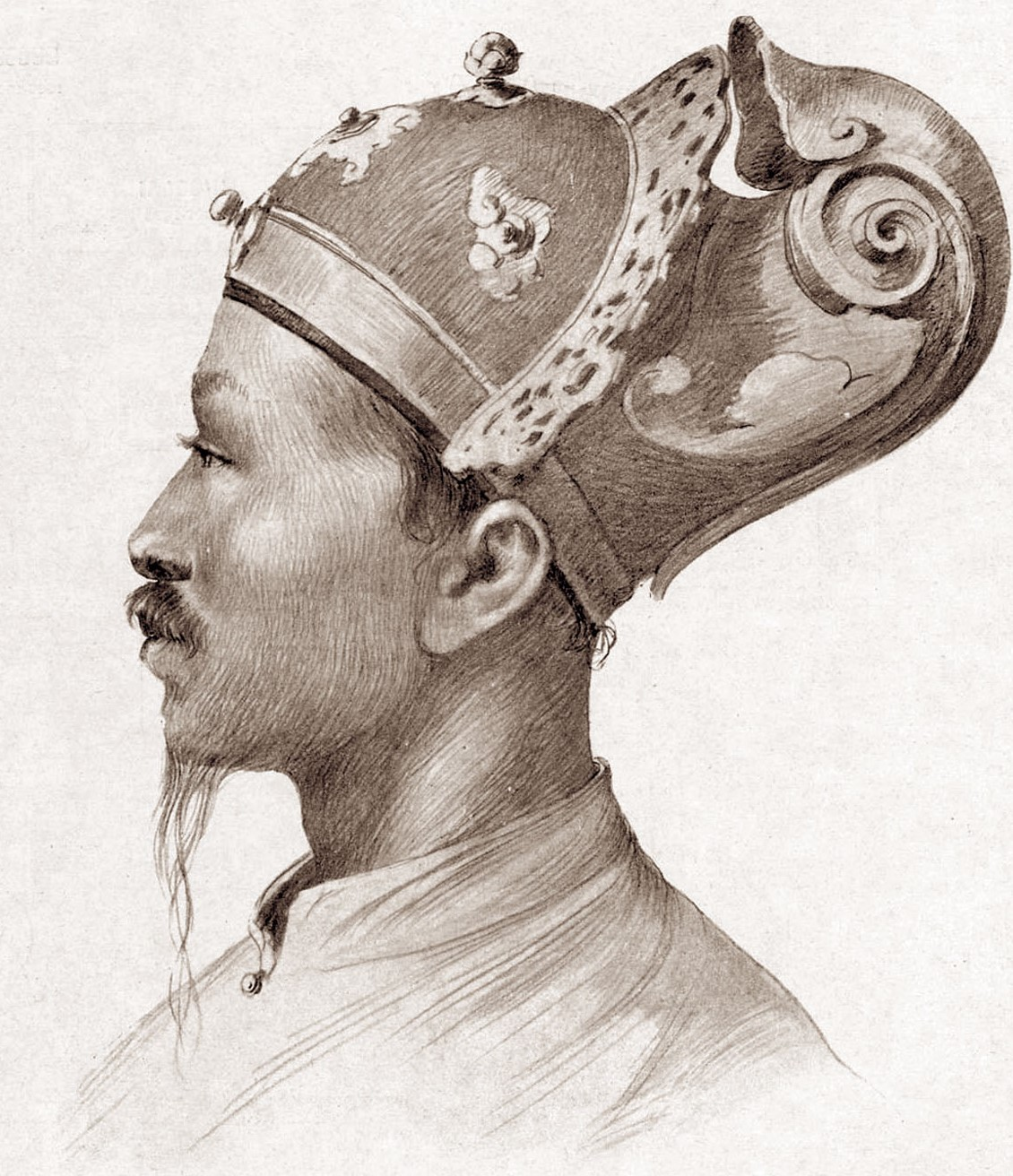
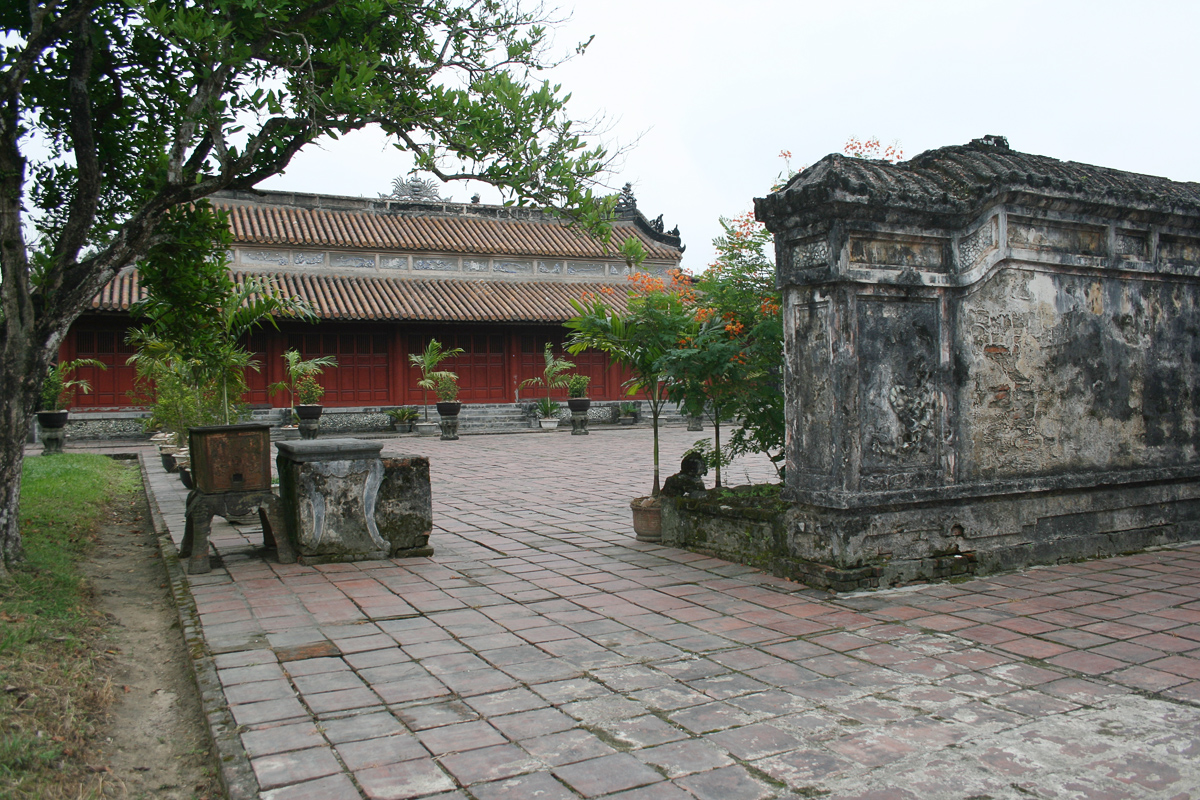
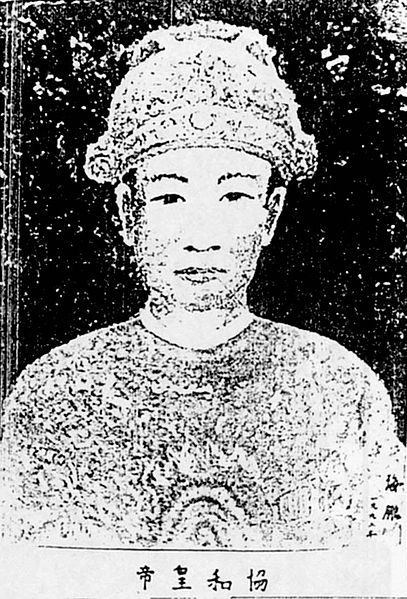
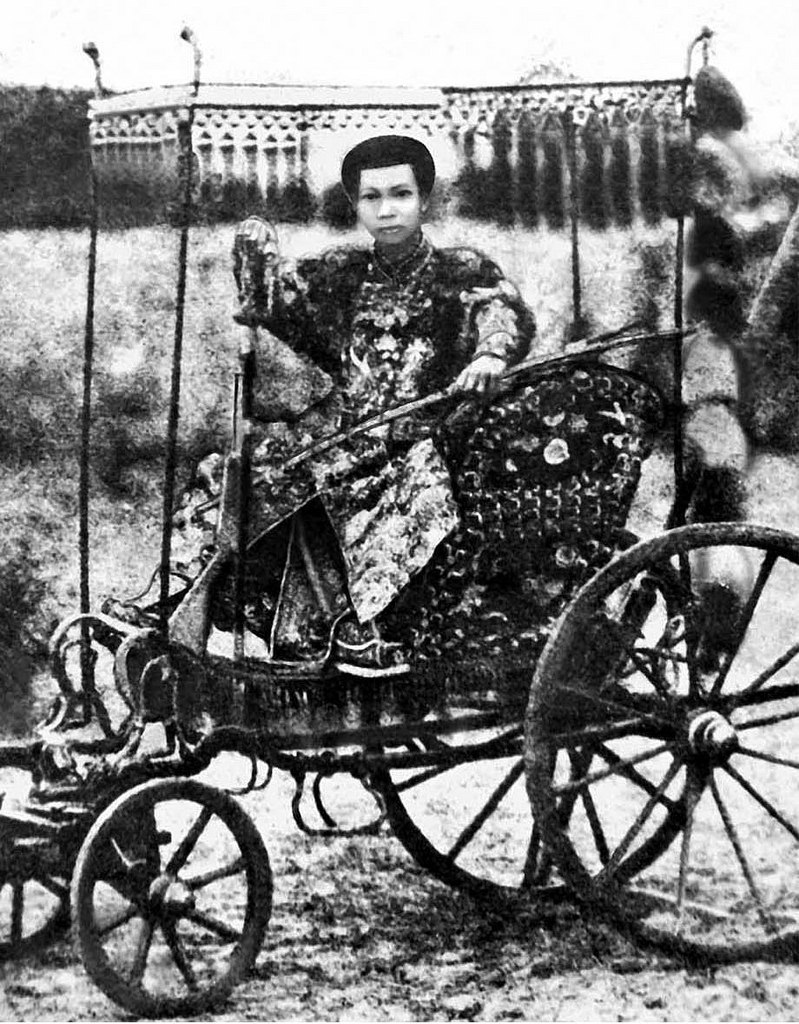
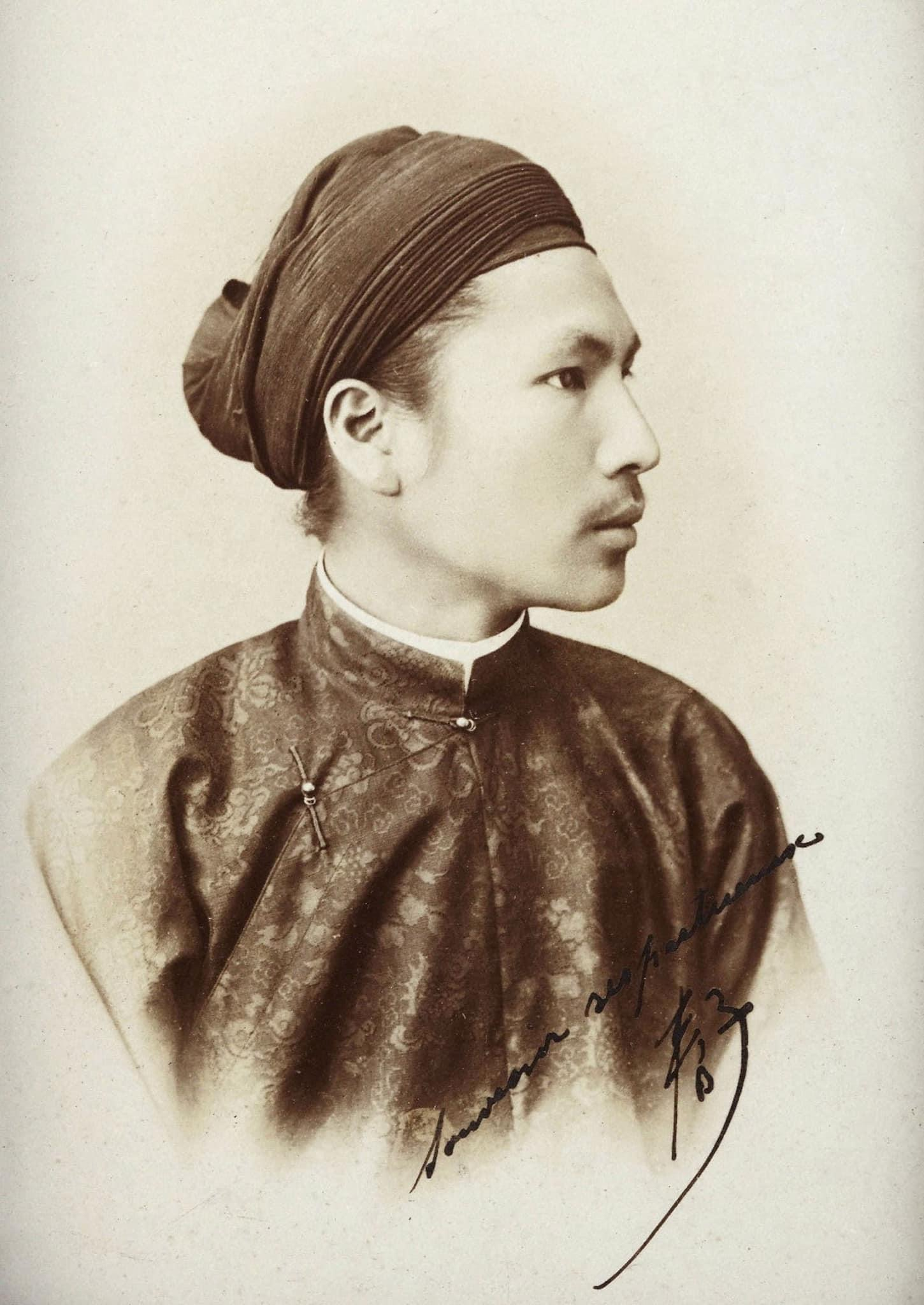
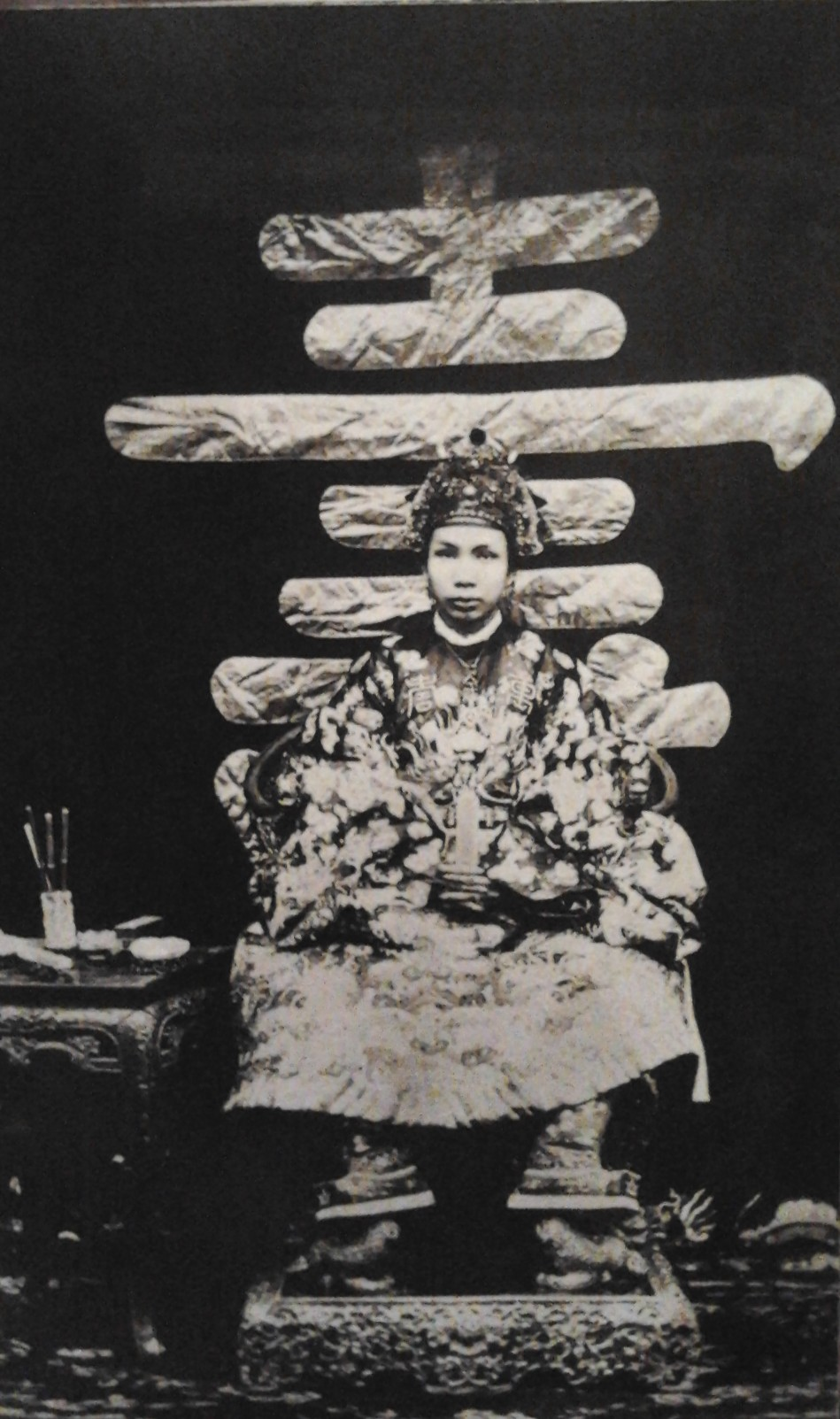
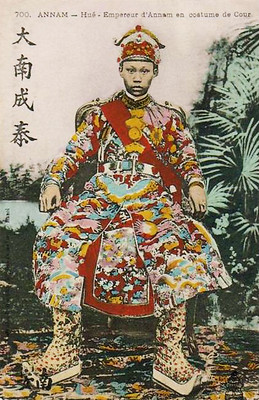
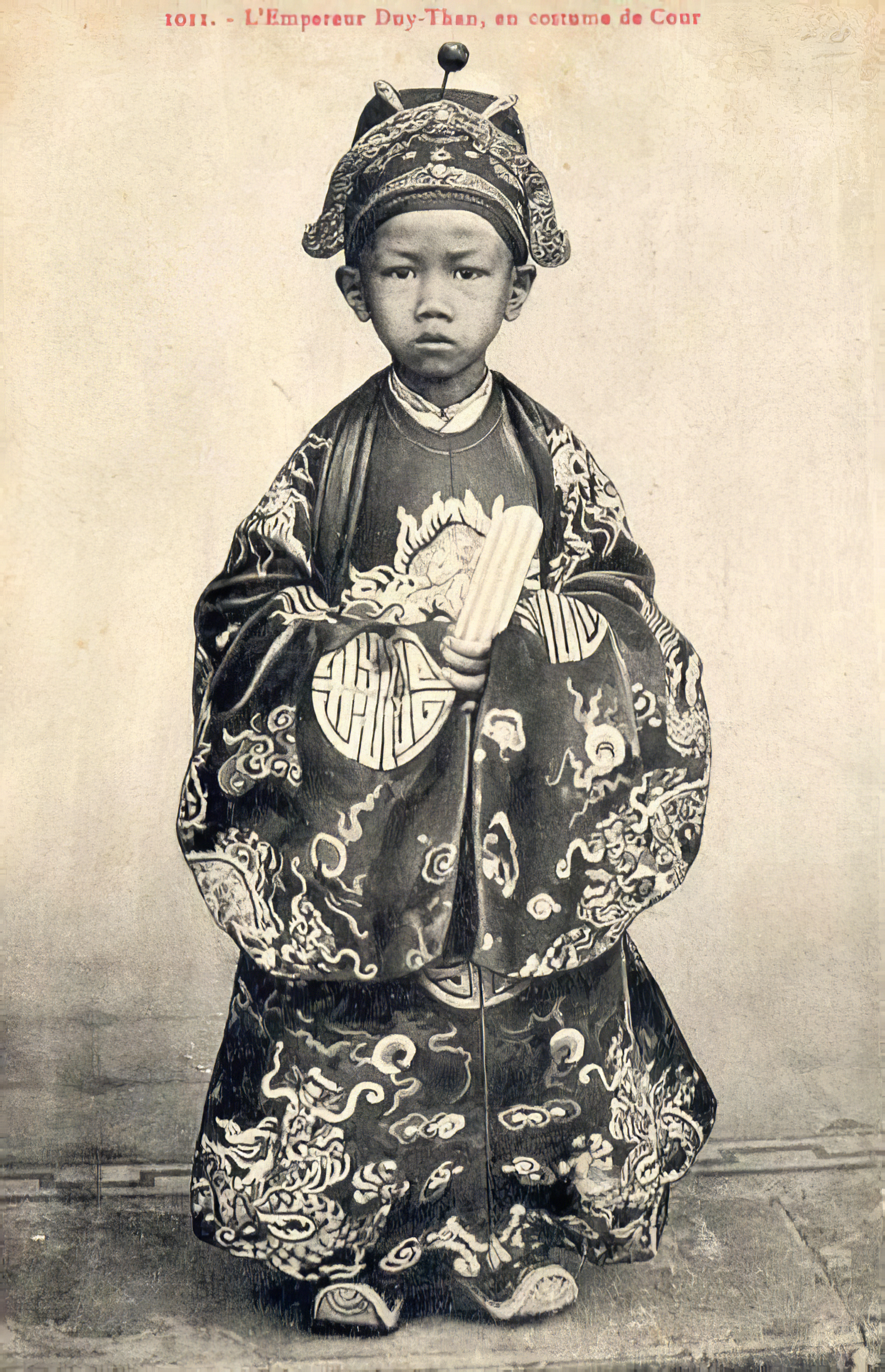
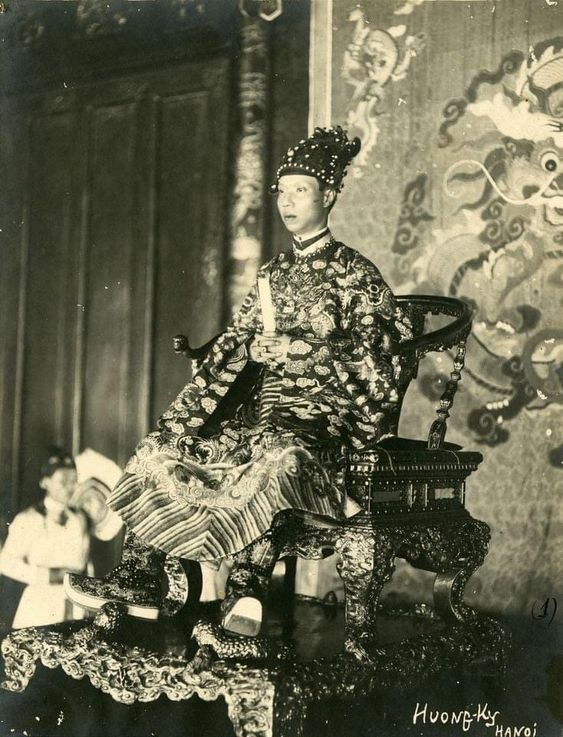
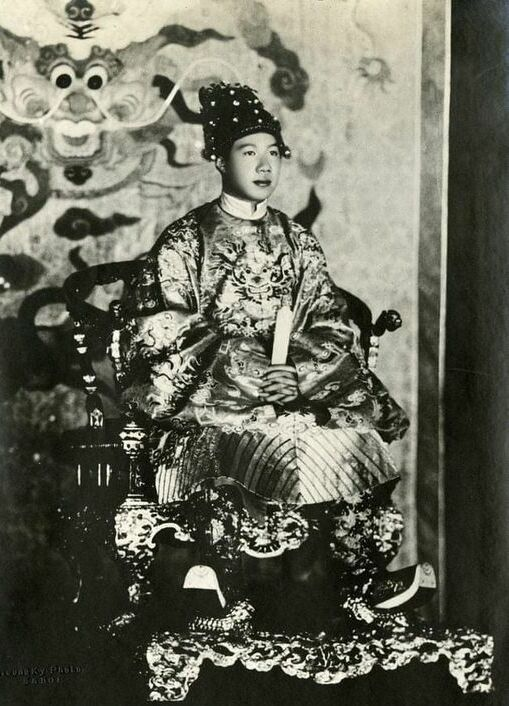
Emperor	Image	Temple name	Full name	Reign
Gia Long (嘉隆)		Thế Tổ (世祖)	Nguyễn Phúc Ánh (阮福暎)	1802–1820
Minh Mạng (明命)		Thánh Tổ (聖祖)	Nguyễn Phúc Đảm (阮福膽)	1820–1841
Thiệu Trị (紹治)		Hiến Tổ (憲祖)	Nguyễn Phúc Miên Tông (阮福綿宗)	1841–1847
Tự Đức (嗣德)		Dực Tông (翼宗)	Nguyễn Phúc Hồng Nhậm (阮福洪任)	1847–1883
Dục Đức (育德)		Cung Tông (恭宗)	Nguyễn Phúc Ưng Ái (Nguyễn Phúc Ưng Chân) (阮福膺𩡤 / 阮福膺禛)	1883 (3 days)
Hiệp Hòa (協和)		none	Nguyễn Phúc Hồng Dật (阮福洪佚)	1883 (6 months)
Kiến Phúc (建福)		Giản Tông (簡宗)	Nguyễn Phúc Ưng Đăng (阮福膺登)	1883–1884
Hàm Nghi (咸宜)		none	Nguyễn Phúc Minh (阮福明)	1884–1885
Đồng Khánh (同慶)		Cảnh Tông (景宗)	Nguyễn Phúc Ưng Kỷ (阮福膺祺)	1885–1889
Thành Thái (成泰)		none	Nguyễn Phúc Bửu Lân (阮福寶嶙)	1889–1907
Duy Tân (維新)		none	Nguyễn Phúc Vĩnh San (阮福永珊)	1907–1916
Khải Định (啓定)		Hoằng Tông (弘宗)	Nguyễn Phúc Bửu Đảo (阮福寶嶹)	1916–1925
Bảo Đại (保大)		none	Nguyễn Phúc Vĩnh Thụy (阮福永瑞)	1926–1945

== Non-Vietnamese nations ==
=== Champa (192–1832) ===
Dynasty	King	Real name	Reign
I Dynasty	Sri Mara	Ch'ű-lien	192–?
I Dynasty	?		
I Dynasty	?		
I Dynasty		Fan Hsiung	fl. 270
I Dynasty		Fan Yi	c. 284–336
II Dynasty		Fan Wen	336–349
II Dynasty		Fan Fo	349–?
II Dynasty	Bhadravarman I	Fan Hu Ta	380–413
II Dynasty	Gangaraja	Fan Ti Chen	
II Dynasty	Manorathavarman		
II Dynasty		Fan Diwen	died c. 420
III Dynasty	Fan Yang Mai I	Fan Yangmai	c. 420–421
III Dynasty	Fan Yang Mai II	Fan Duo	c. 431 – c. 455
III Dynasty		Fan Shencheng	c. 455 – c. 484
III Dynasty		Fan Danggenchun	c. 484 – c. 492
III Dynasty		Fan Zhunong	c. 492 – c. 498
III Dynasty		Fan Wenkuan or Fan Wenzan	c. 502 – c. 510
III Dynasty	Devavarman	Fan Tiankai	c. 510 – c. 526
III Dynasty	Vijayavarman		c. 526/9
IV Dynasty	Rudravarman I		c. 529 ?
IV Dynasty	Sambhuvarman	Fan Fanzhi	572 – 629
IV Dynasty	Kandarpadharma	Fan Touli	629 –
IV Dynasty	Prabhasadharma	Fan Zhenlong	– 645
IV Dynasty	Bhadresvaravarman		645–?
IV Dynasty	Daughter of Kandarpadharma (FEMALE)		?–653
IV Dynasty	Vikrantavarman I	Zhuge Di	653–c. 686
IV Dynasty	Naravahanavarman		c. 686 – c. ?
IV Dynasty	Vikrantavarman II		c. 687 – c. 731
Rudravarman II		c. 731/58	
V Dynasty (of Panduranga)	Prithindravarman		? 758–?
V Dynasty (of Panduranga)	Satyavarman		c. 770/87
V Dynasty (of Panduranga)	Indravarman I		c. 787/803
V Dynasty (of Panduranga)	Harivarman I		c. 803/17 > ?
V Dynasty (of Panduranga)	Vikrantavarman III		? -c. 854
VI Dynasty (of Bhrigu)	Indravarman II		c. 854/98
VI Dynasty (of Bhrigu)	Jaya Sinhavarman I		c. 898/903
VI Dynasty (of Bhrigu)	Jaya Saktivarman		
VI Dynasty (of Bhrigu)	Bhadravarman II		fl. 910
VI Dynasty (of Bhrigu)	Indravarman III		c. 918–959
VI Dynasty (of Bhrigu)	Jaya Indravarman I		959– < 965
VI Dynasty (of Bhrigu)	Paramesvaravarman I	Bo-mei-mei-shui Yang Bu-yin-cha (波美美稅楊布印茶)	< 965–982
VI Dynasty (of Bhrigu)	Indravarman IV		982–986's
VI Dynasty (of Bhrigu)	Liu Ji-zong	Lưu Kế Tông (劉継宗)	c. 986–989
VII Dynasty	Harivarman II	Yang Tuo Pai (楊陀排)	c. 989–997
VII Dynasty	Yang Bo Zhan, of Fan	Yang Bozhan (楊波占)	?
VII Dynasty	Yang Pu Ku Vijaya	Yan Pu Ku Vijaya Sri (楊甫恭毘施離)	c. 998–1007
VII Dynasty	Harivarman III	Yang Pu Ju-bi-cha-she-li (楊普俱毘茶室離)	fl. 1010
VII Dynasty	Paramesvaravarman II	Yang Pu Ju-bi-cha-she-li (楊普俱毘茶室離)	fl. 1018
VII Dynasty	Vikrantavarman IV	Yang Bu Ju-shi-li (楊卜俱室離)	?–?1030
VII Dynasty	Jaya Simhavarman II		?1030–?1044
VIII Dynasty (of the South)	Jaya Paramesvaravarman I	Ku Sri Paramesvarmadeva Yang Pu (倶舍波微收羅婆麻提楊卜)	1044–1060
VIII Dynasty (of the South)	Bhadravarman III		?–1061
VIII Dynasty (of the South)	Rudravarman III		1061–1074
IX Dynasty	Harivarman IV		1074–1080
IX Dynasty	Jaya Indravarman II		1080–1081, 1086–1114
IX Dynasty	Paramabhodhisatva	–	1081–1086
IX Dynasty	Harivarman V	Yang Bu Ma-die (楊卜麻 曡)	1114–1139
X Dynasty	Jaya Indravarman III		1139/45
XI Dynasty	Rudravarman IV (Khmer vassal)		1145–1147
XI Dynasty	Jaya Harivarman I		1147–1167
XI Dynasty	Jaya Harivarman II		1167
XI Dynasty	Jaya Indravarman IV		1167–1190, died 1192
XII Dynasty	Suryajayavarmadeva (Khmer vassal in Vijaya)		1190–1191
XII Dynasty	Suryavarmadeva (Khmer vassal in Pandurang)		1190–1203
XII Dynasty	Jaya Indravarman V (in Vijaya)		1191
XII Dynasty	Champa under Cambodian rules		1203–1220
XII Dynasty	Jaya Paramesvaravarman II		1220–c.1252
XII Dynasty	Jaya Indravarman VI		c.1252–1257
XII Dynasty	Indravarman V		1257–1288
XII Dynasty	Jaya Sinhavarman III		1288–1307
XII Dynasty	Jaya Sinhavarman IV		1307–1312
XII Dynasty	Chế Nang (Vietnamese Vassal)		1312–1318
XIII Dynasty	Chế A Nan		1318–1342
XIII Dynasty	Trà Hoa Bồ Đề		1342–1360
XIII Dynasty	Chế Bồng Nga (Red king-strongest king)		1360–1390
XIV Dynasty	Jaya Simhavarman VI		1390–1400
XIV Dynasty	Indravarman VI		1400–1441
XIV Dynasty	Virabhadravarman		1441–?
XIV Dynasty	Maija Vijaya		1441–1446
XIV Dynasty	Moho Kouei-Lai		1446–1449
Moho Kouei-Yeou		1449–1458	
XV Dynasty	Moho P'an-Lo-Yue		1458–1460
XV Dynasty	Tra-Toan		1460–1471
Dynasty of the South	Po Ro Me		1627–1651
Dynasty of the South	Po Niga		1652–1660
Dynasty of the South	Po Saut		1660–1692
Dynasty of Po Saktiraidaputih, vassal Cham rulers under the Nguyễn lords	Po Saktirai da putih		1695–1728
Dynasty of Po Saktiraidaputih, vassal Cham rulers under the Nguyễn lords	Po Ganvuh da putih		1728–1730
Dynasty of Po Saktiraidaputih, vassal Cham rulers under the Nguyễn lords	Po Thuttirai		1731–1732
Dynasty of Po Saktiraidaputih, vassal Cham rulers under the Nguyễn lords	vacant		1732–1735
Dynasty of Po Saktiraidaputih, vassal Cham rulers under the Nguyễn lords	Po Rattirai		1735–1763
Dynasty of Po Saktiraidaputih, vassal Cham rulers under the Nguyễn lords	Po Tathun da moh-rai		1763–1765
Dynasty of Po Saktiraidaputih, vassal Cham rulers under the Nguyễn lords	Po Tithuntirai da paguh		1765–1780
Dynasty of Po Saktiraidaputih, vassal Cham rulers under the Nguyễn lords	Po Tithuntirai da parang		1780–1781
Dynasty of Po Saktiraidaputih, vassal Cham rulers under the Nguyễn lords	vacant		1781–1783
Dynasty of Po Saktiraidaputih, vassal Cham rulers under the Nguyễn lords	Chei Krei Brei		1783–1786
Dynasty of Po Saktiraidaputih, vassal Cham rulers under the Nguyễn lords	Po Tithun da parang		1786–1793
Dynasty of Po Saktiraidaputih, vassal Cham rulers under the Nguyễn lords	Po Lathun da paguh		1793–1799
Dynasty of Po Saktiraidaputih, vassal Cham rulers under the Nguyễn lords	Po Chong Chan		1799–1822

=== Funan (68–550) ===
King	Reign
Soma (fem.)	latter 1st century
Kaundinya I (Hun-t'ien)	latter 1st century
?	
?	
Hun P’an-h’uang	second half of 2nd century
P’an-P’an	early 3rd century
Fan Shih-Man	c. 205–225
Fan Chin-Sheng	c. 225
Fan Chan	c. 225 – c. 240
Fan Hsun	c. 240–287
Fan Ch’ang	c. 245
Fan Hsiung	270 ?–285
?	
?	
Chandan (Chu Chan-t’an)	357
?	
?	
Kaundinya II (Chiao Chen-ju)	?–434
Sresthavarman ? or Sri Indravarman (Che-li-pa-mo or Shih-li-t’o-pa-mo)	434–438
?	
?	
Kaundinya Jayavarman (She-yeh-pa-mo)	484–514
Rudravarman	514–539, died 550
Sarvabhauma ? (Liu-t’o-pa-mo)	?
?	c. 550–627

=== Chenla (550–802) ===
Order	King	Reign
1	Bhavavarman I	around 550–600
2	Mahendravarman	around 600–616
3	Isanavarman I	616–635
4	Bhavavarman II	639–657
5	Candravarman?	?
6	Jayavarman I	around 657–690
7	Queen Jayadevi	690–713
8	Sambhuvarman	713–716
9	Pushkaraksha	716–730
10	Sambhuvarman	around 730–760
11	Rajendravarman I	around 760–780
12	Mahipativarman	around 780–788

=== Ngưu Hống (11th century – 1433) ===
Order	King	Reign
1	Tạo Lò	?–?
2	Lạng Chượng	around 1000–1067
3	Lò Lẹt	1292–1329
4	Con Mường	1329–1341
5	Ta Cằm	1341–1392
6	Ta Ngần	1392–1418
7	Phạ Nhù	1418–1420
8	Mứn Hằm	1420–1441

== See also ==
- Family tree of Vietnamese monarchs
- List of Vietnamese dynasties
- Vietnamese era name
- Emperor at home, king abroad
