= Timeline of early independent Vietnam =

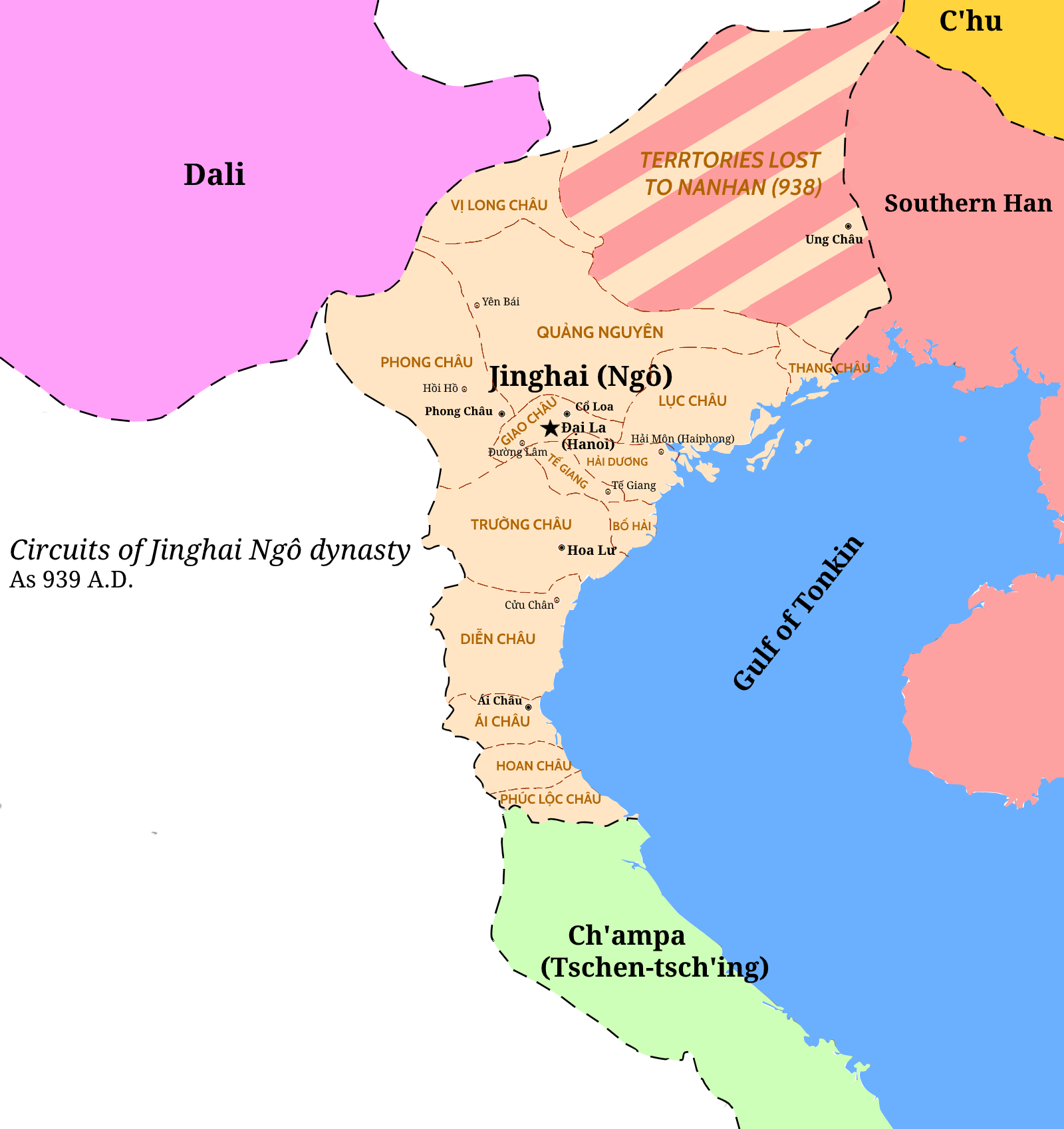
Ngô dynasty ruling Tĩnh Hải circuit in 938

This is a timeline of Early Independent Vietnam, covering the period of Vietnamese history from the rise of the Tĩnh Hải circuit ruled by the Khúc clan (r. 905–923/930) to the kingdom of Đại Cồ Việt ruled by the Early Lê dynasty (980–1009).

== 10th century ==
Year	Date	Event
906		Khúc Thừa Dụ of the Khúc clan takes control of Annan as jiedushi governor of Tĩnh Hải circuit and establishes tributary relations with Later Liang
907		Khúc Thừa Dụ's son, Khúc Hạo succeed the title jiedushi and is recognized by Zhu Quanzhong
908		Khúc Hạo dies and is succeeded by his son, Khúc Thừa Mỹ
911		Khúc Hạo's son, Khúc Thừa Mỹ brings to Later Liang dynasty's court 500 Vietnamese bananas, seafoods, jades, gold and silver objects as tributes
930		Southern Han invades Annam and removes the Khúc clan from power; Khúc Thừa Mỹ lives out the rest of his days at the Southern Han court
931		Dương Đình Nghệ expels Southern Han from Đại La and declares himself governor
937		Dương Đình Nghệ is murdered by his subject, Kiều Công Tiễn, and Kiều Công Tiễn calls Southern Han for military assistance
938	December	Battle of Bạch Đằng: Southern Han's fleet led by Liu Hongcao to subdue Annam is defeated on Bạch Đằng River by Vietnamese general Ngô Quyền
939	1 February	Ngô Quyền establishes his monarchy at Cổ Loa Citadel, known in Vietnamese history texts as the Ngô dynasty
944	14 February	Ngô Quyền dies; his son Ngô Xương Ngập is ousted by Dương Tam Kha, who seizes the throne for himself
950		Dương Tam Kha is deposed by Ngô Xương Văn, who shares power with his brother Ngô Xương Ngập in a two-headed monarchy
954		Ngô Xương Ngập dies, after which Ngô Xương Văn declares himself a vassal of Southern Han
965		Ngô Xương Văn dies in battle against the rebellion of Đường Nguyễn; his son Ngô Xương Xí succeeds him but fails to retain control over the realm, resulting in the Anarchy of the 12 Warlords
968		Duke Đinh Bộ Lĩnh reunites the country under the Đinh dynasty and ends the Anarchy of the 12 Warlords
972		Đại Cồ Việt's independence is recognized by Song dynasty, establishing the nominate tributary relation
979	October	Đinh Bộ Lĩnh is assassinated by a eunuch and his infant son Đinh Phế Đế succeeds him; Dương Vân Nga becomes regent, however under the pressure of an impending Song dynasty invasion, she threw her support behind the commander-in-chief Lê Hoàn
981		Battle of Bạch Đằng (981): Song dynasty invades Đại Cồ Việt with initial success but is ambushed and the campaign ends with Lê Hoàn accepting Song suzerainty
982		Champa detains envoys from Đại Cồ Việt, resulting in an invasion by Lê Hoàn, and the death of the Cham king Paramesvaravarman I and the plundering of its capital, Vijaya
986		A Vietnamese merchant in Indrapura named Lưu Kỳ Tông (Lieou Ki-Tsong) takes the throne of Cham king Indravarman IV
990		Song dynasty sends emissary to Hoa Lư
995	Summer	Vietnamese troops and warships attacked Chinese border towns
997		Song Emperor gives Lê Hoàn the second title King of Nanping (南平王) in addition with King of Giao Chỉ (交趾郡王)

== 11th century ==
Year	Date	Event
1005		Lê Hoàn dies, causing a succession dispute that saw Lê Trung Tông killed after ruling for only 3 days; Lê Long Đĩnh succeeds him as new ruler of the Vietnamese
1006		Lê Long Đĩnh receives hundred of Mahayana Buddhist sutras, Taoist books, Classic literature from Song dynasty and translate into Vietnamese
1007		Lê Long Đĩnh sends tributes to Song dynasty, and receives back clothes, sutras, buckle belts
1009		Lê Long Đĩnh dies from hemorrhoids; military leader Lý Công Uẩn replaces the Lê dynasty and establishes the Lý dynasty

== Gallery ==
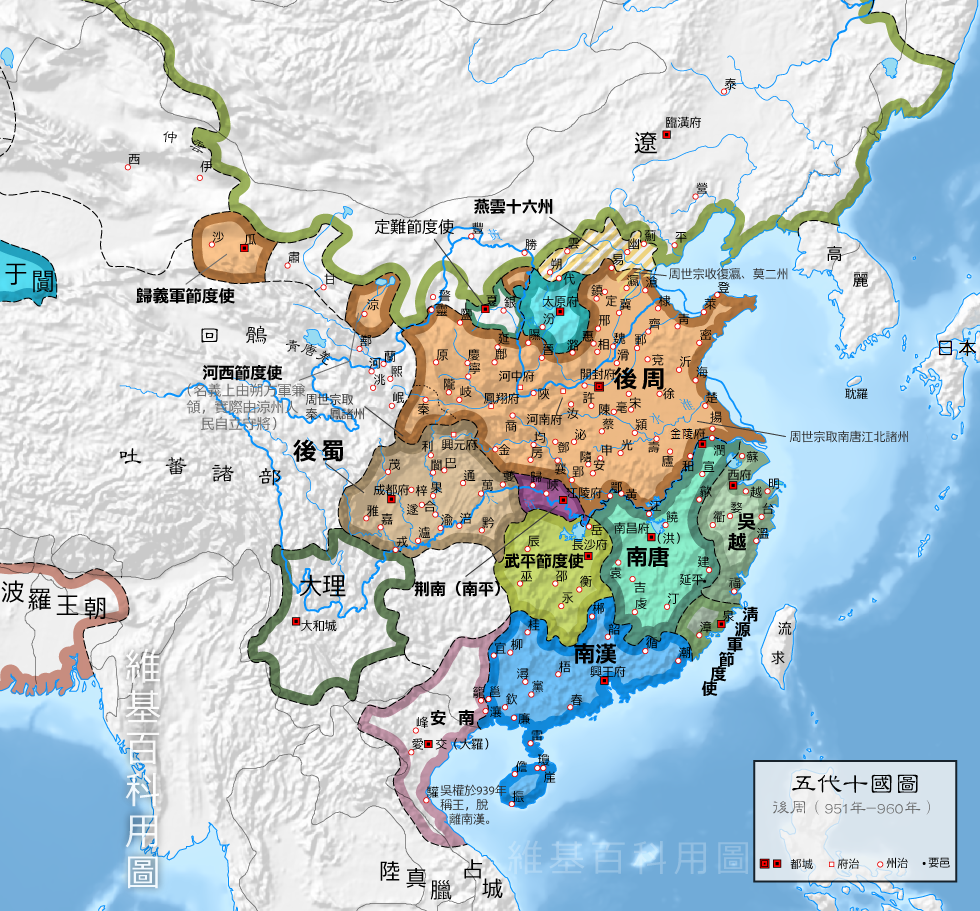
Map of China and Vietnam during 951–960. Annam locates in the south, bordered by light purple line.

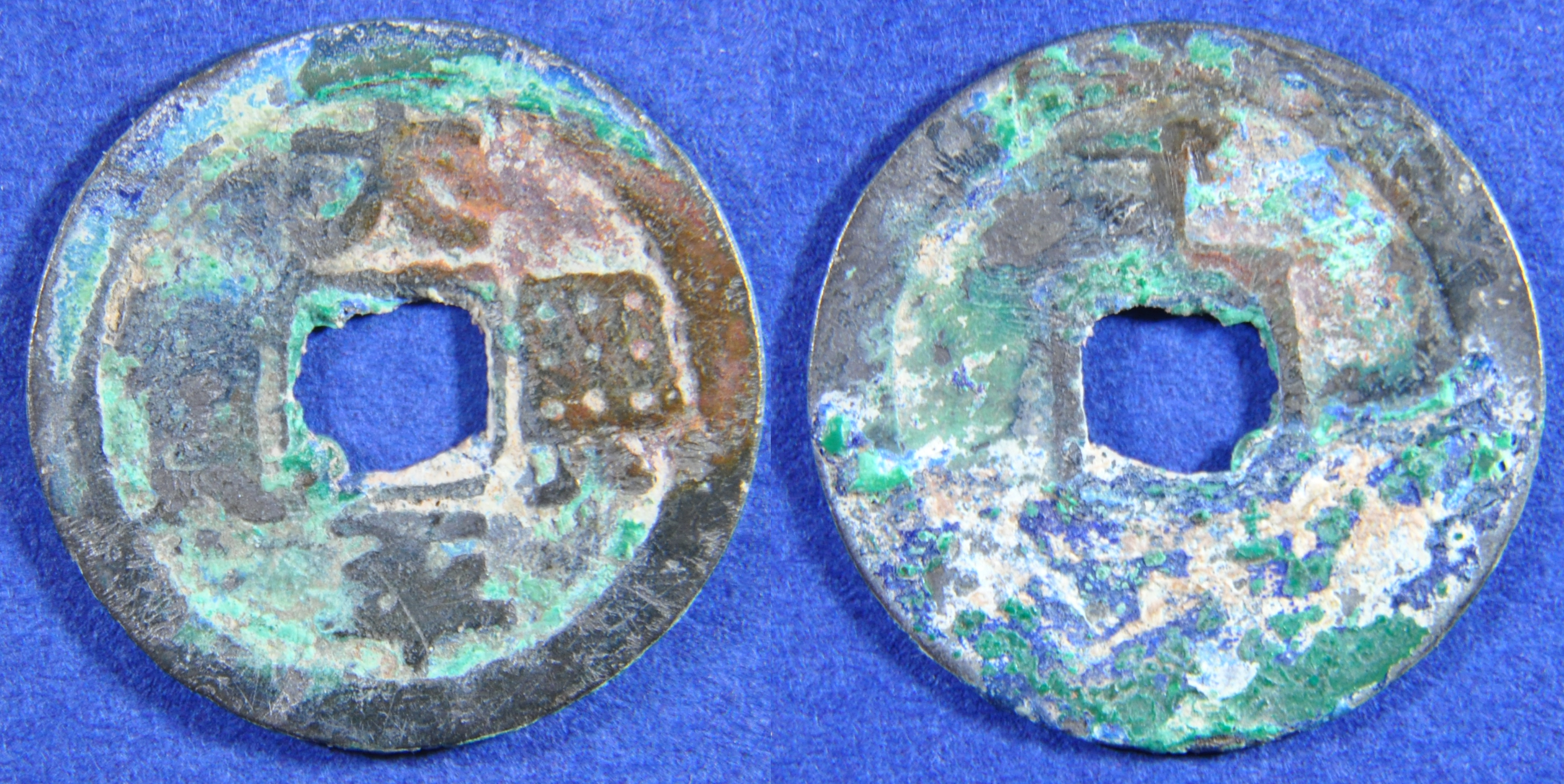
Coins Thái Bình Hưng Bảo issued by emperor Đinh Tiên Hoàng in 970, the first Vietnamese native cash coins

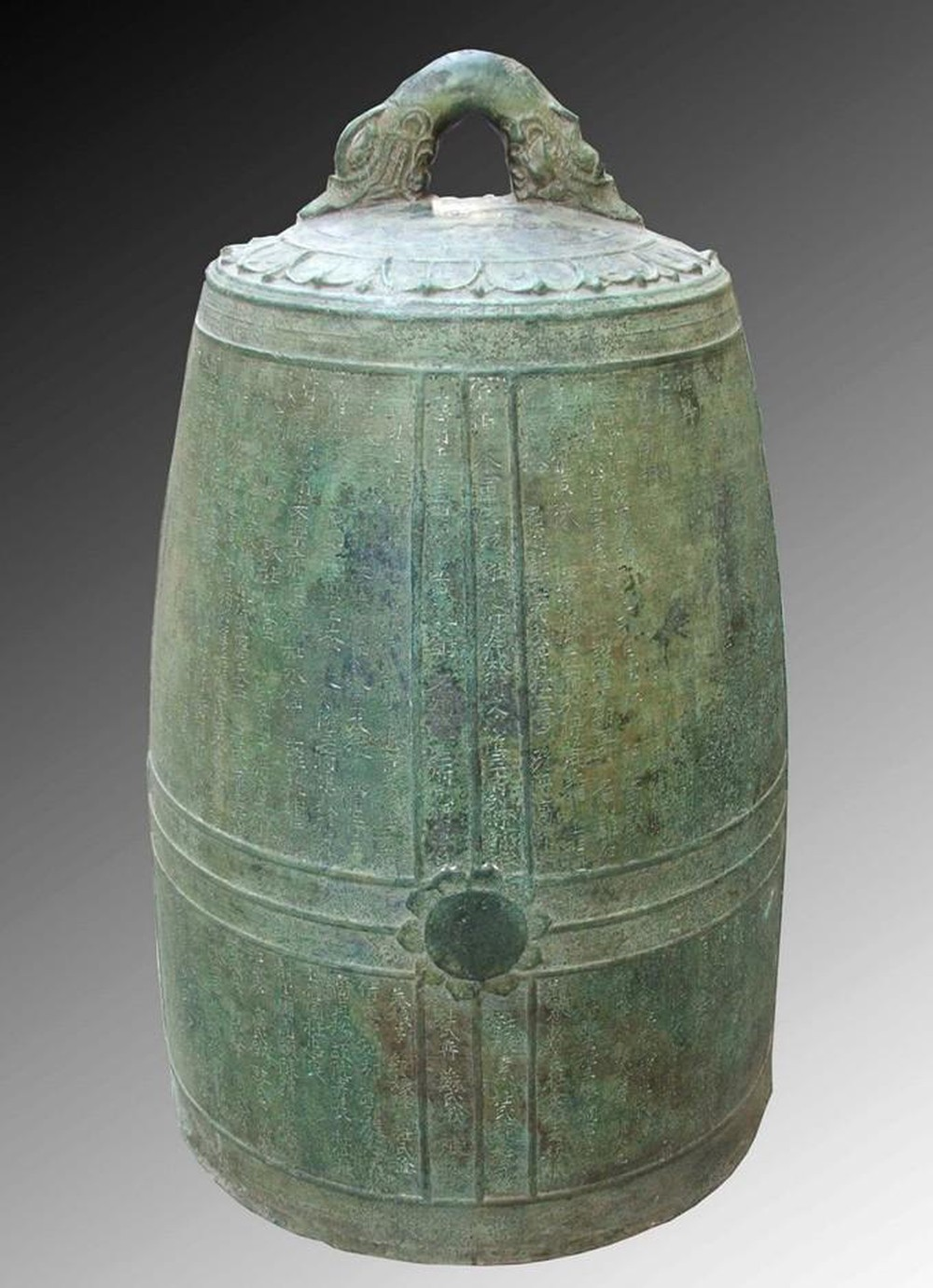
Nhật Tảo bronze bell cast in 948 by Hạ Từ Liêm blacksmith, contains Buddhist inscriptions and some earliest Vietnamese Nôm script characters

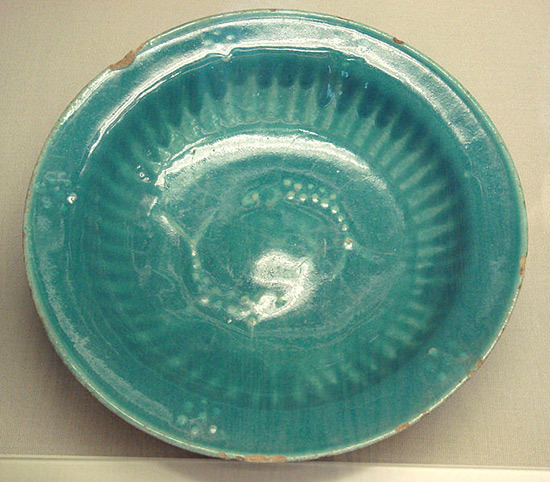
Ceramic bowl originated from Abbasid Caliphate, dated 940s in Hanoi

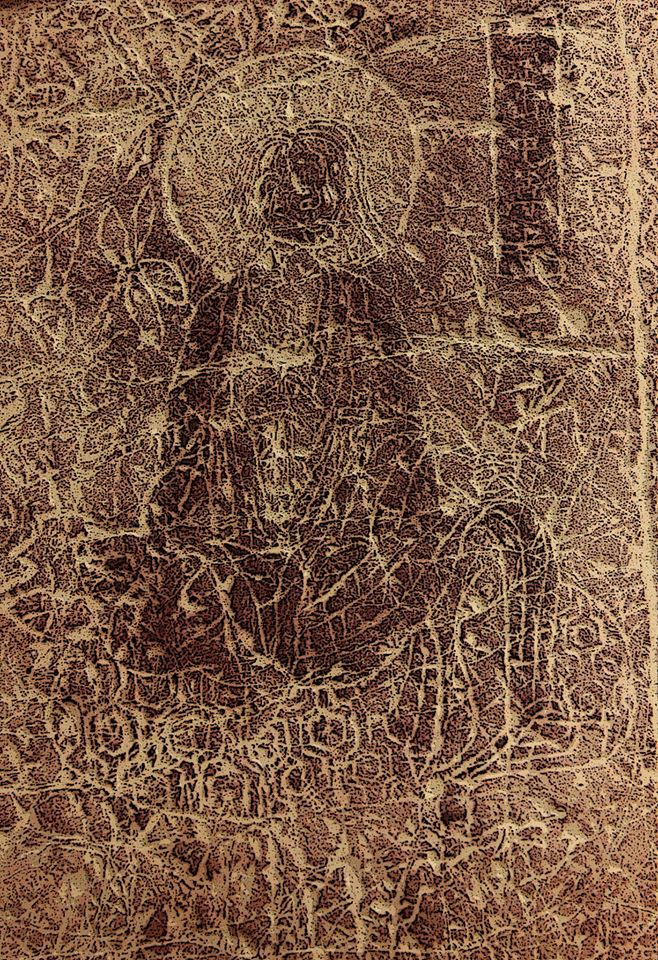
Mural paintings of one Buddhist saint Arhat in Liên Hoa cave, Hoa Lư, Ninh Bình
