= Ngô Xương Ngập =

Ngô Xương Ngập 吳昌岌
- Royal of Jinghai

Grand Prince of Tĩnh Hải quân
- Reign: 950–954
- Predecessor: Dương Tam Kha
- Successor: Ngô Xương Văn
- Co-king: Ngô Xương Văn (Nam Tấn Vương)
- Born: ?
- Died: 954; Cổ Loa
- Issue: Ngô Xương Xí; Khuông Việt
Names
- Ngô Xương Ngập (吳昌岌)
Regnal name
- Thiên Sách Vương (天策王)
- Dynasty: Ngô dynasty
- Father: Ngô Quyền

Ngô Xương Ngập (chữ Hán: 吳昌岌, died 954), formally King of Thiên Sách (天策王), was a co-ruler of the Ngô dynasty of Vietnam. He was the eldest son of Ngô Quyền, the dynastic founder.

Ngô Quyền named Dương Tam Kha as regent for his nephew, Ngô Xương Ngập, on his deathbed in 944. However, after Ngô Quyền's death, Dương Tam Kha forced Ngập to abdicate and installed himself as ruler and arguably as being the rightful successor to his father, Dương Đình Nghệ. The ousted Ngô Xương Ngập fled to Trà Hưong village, Nam Sách, and was hidden under the protection of his retainer, Phạm Lệnh Công. Dương Tam Kha sent Đỗ Cảnh Thạc and Dương Cát Lợi to arrest him, which made Phạm Lệnh Công afraid and went into hiding inside a cave.

In 950, Dương Tam Kha was dethroned by Ngập's younger brother, Prince Ngô Xương Văn in a counter coup d'état. Prince Văn then crowned himself as Nam Tấn Vương (King of Nam Tấn), and summoned his ousted brother Ngập to return to the capital, Cổ Loa. Ngô Xương Văn then appointed Ngập as a co-ruler and was titled as Thiên Sách Vương (King of Thiên Sách). It was called Một nước, Hai vua ("one country, two kings") in Vietnamese history. Both ruling brothers was known as Hậu Ngô Vương (後吳王). However, the returned Ngập managed to overtake his younger brother's authority by reclaiming himself as the rightful crown prince where he gained support from leading court officials. Ngô Xương Ngập became the de facto ruler and held the real power and relegated his brother Văn as a nominal co-ruler who held mainly ceremonial duties and abstained from active political affairs or military campaigns until Ngập's death in 954.

Ngập died during consensual sex in 954. He had two sons mentioned in history records: Ngô Xương Xí, one of Twelve Warlords; Khuông Việt (Ngô Chân Lưu), an important Buddhist monk and politician during the rule of Đinh family.

Ngô Xương Ngập Ngô dynasty Died: 954
Preceded by Dương Tam Kha	King of Nam Việt concurrently with Ngô Xương Văn: 950–954	Succeeded by Ngô Xương Văn
