= Phạm Bạch Hổ =

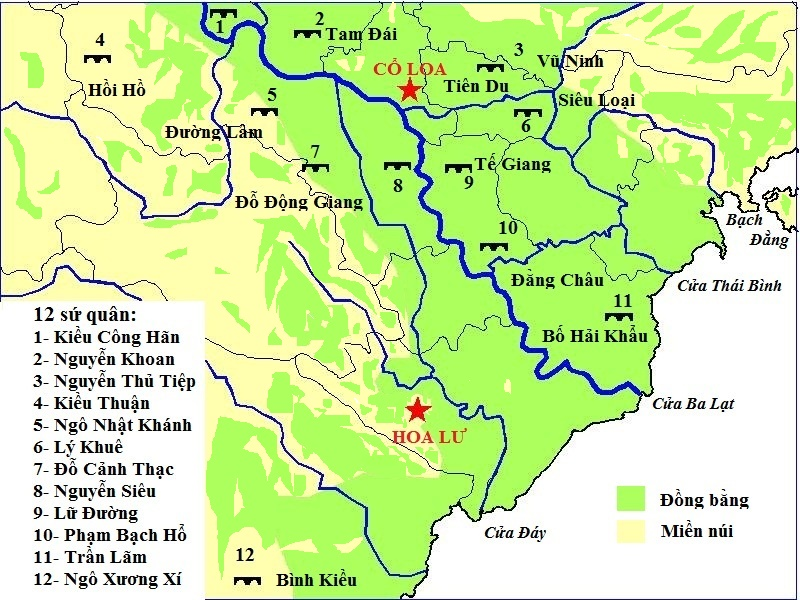
12 Warlords

Phạm Bạch Hổ (chữ Hán: 范白虎, 910–972) was a warlord of Vietnam during the Period of the 12 Warlords.

He was a general of Ngô Quyền and took part in Battle of Bạch Đằng. After Quyền's death, he occupied Đằng Châu (modern a part of Hưng Yên Province), and titled himself Phạm Phòng Át (范防遏). Later, he was defeated by Đinh Bộ Lĩnh. After the defeat, he remained with the title of Thân vệ Đại tướng quân (Bodyguard of the General).
