= Ngô dynasty =

First Vietnamese dynasty after the Third Chinese domination of Vietnam (939–965)

Tĩnh Hải Quân 靜海軍
- 939–965
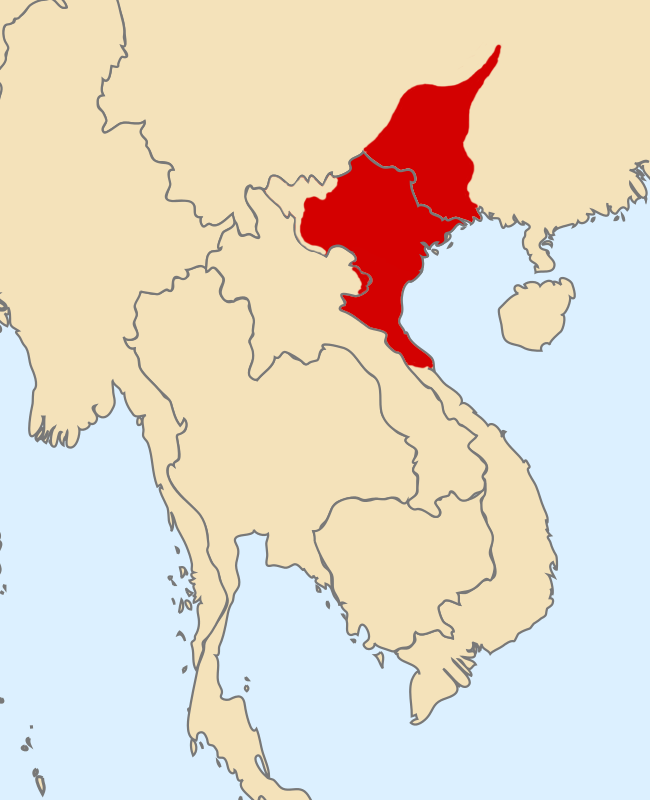
- early years of Ngô dynasty

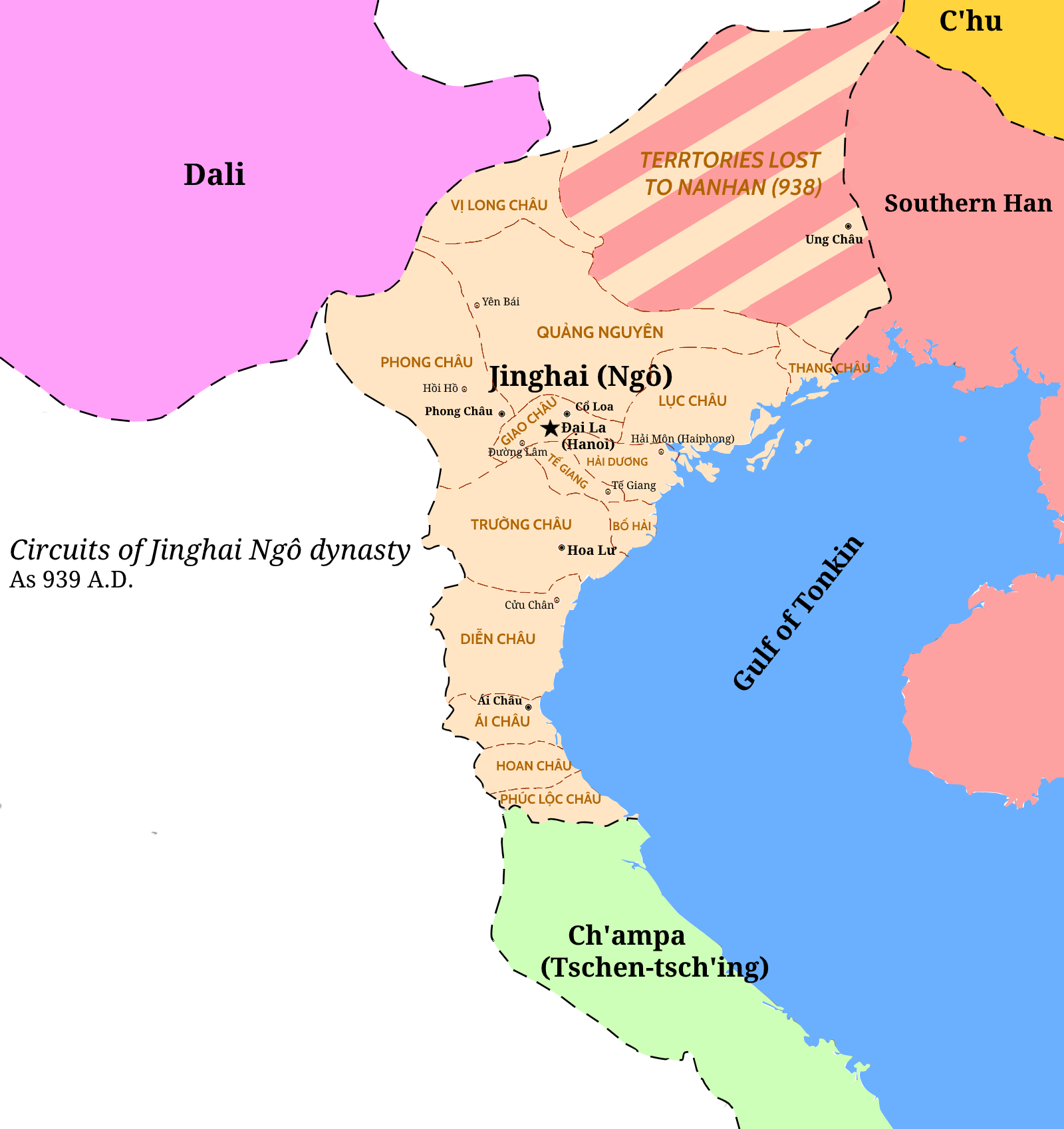
- The administrative division map of Tĩnh Hải quân (Jinghai) under Ngô dynasty in 939
- Capital: Cổ Loa
- Government: Monarchy
- King/Jiedushi
  - 938–944: Tiền Ngô Vương (first)
  - 944–950: Dương Bình Vương
  - 950–965: Nam Tấn vương & Thiên Sách vương (co-rulers)
- Historical era: Medieval Asia
  - Battle of Bạch Đằng (938): December 938
  - Ngô Quyền founded the dynasty: February 1 939
  - Dương Tam Kha seized the throne: 944
  - Overthrow of Dương Tam Kha, with Ngô Xương Văn and Ngô Xương Ngập both declared as kings: 950
  - Death of Ngô Xương Ngập: 954
  - Death of Ngô Xương Văn: 965
  - Anarchy of the 12 Warlords: 965
Preceded by	Succeeded by
Third Era of Northern Domination	Anarchy of the 12 Warlords
- Today part of: Vietnam; China

Ngô
- Country: Tĩnh Hải quân
- Founded: 8th century
- Founder: Ngô Quyền
- Final ruler: Ngô Xương Văn
- Titles: King/Grand Prince of Tĩnh Hải quân
- Estate: Cổ Loa Citadel
- Deposition: 968

The Ngô dynasty (Vietnamese: Nhà Ngô; Chữ Nôm: 茹吳), officially Tĩnh Hải quân (chữ Hán: 靜海軍), was a semi-independent Vietnamese dynasty from 939 to 968. The dynasty was founded by Ngô Quyền, who led the Vietnamese forces in the Battle of Bạch Đằng River against the Chinese Southern Han dynasty in 938.

Around 930, as Ngô Quyền rose to power, northern Vietnam was militarily occupied by the Southern Han and was treated as an autonomous province and vassal state of the Later Tang Dynasty, referred to as Tĩnh Hải quân. Every year the Jiedushi of Tĩnh Hải quân had to pay tribute to its Chinese master in exchange for peace and political support. At the beginning of the 10th century, China was domestically plagued and weakened by civil war during what is known as the Five Dynasties and Ten Kingdoms period. The Chinese were preoccupied with these civil struggles and lost their grip on Tĩnh Hải quân periodically. Tĩnh Hải quân took advantage of this opportunity and proclaimed its independence and seceded from China. Under the rule of Lord Protector Dương Đình Nghệ, the Tĩnh Hải quân state initiated a full blown military campaign for independence.

== Background ==
=== Pre-independence ===
After defeating the Sui dynasty, the Tang dynasty adjusted its administrative divisions and provinces, maintaining Chinese rule in Vietnam. In the late 9th century, however, civil unrest increased and the rebellion of Huang Chao weakened the Tang dynasty. At the beginning of the 10th Century in 905, a member of the Khúc clan of Vietnam, Khúc Thừa Dụ took advantage of the continuing turmoil in China, seized power from the weakened Tang, and appointed himself Jiedushi (Vietnamese: Tiết độ sứ) establishing a degree of autonomy for Vietnam.

In 906, the Tang recognized Jiaozhi as an autonomous state, however a year later the Tang dynasty ended when Zhu Wen overthrew Tang rule establishing the Later Liang Dynasty for himself and ushered in the division of China into the short-lived empires of the Five Dynasties and Ten Kingdoms period. During this time of civil war in China, the Khúc clan attempted to increase its power and control over Vietnam. In Guangzhou province of south China, however, the former Tang governor, Liu Yan declared himself the emperor of the emergent Southern Han kingdom.

In 917, Khúc Thừa Mỹ succeeded Khúc Hạo as Jiedushi of Tĩnh Hải quân and reached out to the Liang Dynasty in northern China, seeking political support as a vassal state. The action angered the Southern Han and in 930 emperor Liu Yan attempted to bring Tĩnh Hải quân under his control by invading the capital city and taking Khúc Thừa Mỹ captive. Shortly thereafter, however, Dương Đình Nghệ, the governor of the Ái Châu district of Tĩnh Hải quân, sent troops to rescue Khúc Thừa Mỹ, defeating the Southern Han army and in the process appointing himself Jiedushi of Jinghai. In 937, Dương Đình Nghệ was assassinated by his official Kiều Công Tiễn who declared himself loyal to the Southern Han's emperor. Immediately thereafter, Dương Đình Nghệ's son in law, general Ngô Quyền, Governor of the Ái district, initiated hostilities against Kiều Công Tiễn.

=== Battle of Bạch Đằng River ===
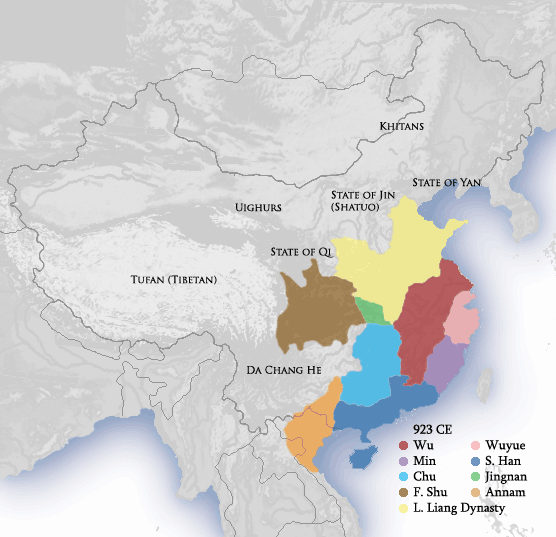
Five Dynasties Ten Kingdoms Period 923 CE and Tĩnh Hải quân (orange) .

Ngô Quyền (897–944) was Dương Đình Nghệ's most loyal general and son-in-law. He served under Dương Đình Nghệ's command and married one of his daughters. After the murder of father-in-law, Ngô Quyền sought revenge. He launched an attack and defeated Kiều Công Tiễn in 938. The latter, before his death in battle with Ngô Quyền, he sent an emissary to Southern Han court to ask for military re-enforcement. The Southern Han state's emperor then sent an army to the South land to assist Kiều Công Tiễn in 938. However, Ngô Quyền's forces were tipped off over the advancing Southern Han army and therefore he quickly mobilized his forces and strategically stationed them in key battle sites.

To defeat the Southern Han army coming to supply aid to his rival, Ngô Quyền and his troops planted iron spikes underneath the Bạch Đằng River and timed the attack of the Southern Han navy. The attack began during high tide which concealed the spikes beneath the water. The Vietnamese forces purposefully held the enemy in check for hours, waiting for the tides receded and the spikes to impale the Chinese armada. With the Southern Han navy in disarray, the Vietnamese forces followed the impalement with ferocious fire attacks and annihilated hundreds of giant warships. The Southern Han navy and the Prince of Southern Han were killed in the battle, thus ending the Southern Han's military ambition over Annam.

== Independence era (938) ==
=== Ngô Quyền's reign ===
The Battle of Bạch Đằng River was the first significant of many victories throughout the centuries at this famous river. Ngô Quyền then ascended to the throne and took the name "Ngô Vương" (King Ngô) or "Tiền Ngô Vương". He moved the capital back to Cổ Loa. He reigned for only five years, until 944, when he died of illness at age 47. The short reign of an ambitious ruler set the stage for future campaigns for independence. Ngô Vương ushered in a new Vietnamese era of continuous independence and political autonomy. However, due to the Ngô dynasty's failure to control chieftains and Ngô Quyền's failure to gain Chinese acknowledgement of his legitimacy as a ruler, it remained little more than a protectorate of the Song dynasty.

=== Royal Court disputes ===
Before his death, Ngô Vương's wish was to see his brother-in-law Dương Tam Kha act as regent for his son Ngô Xương Ngập. However Dương Tam Kha usurped the throne and proclaimed himself "Bình Vương" (平王). He took Ngô Xương Ngập's younger brother, Ngô Xương Văn, as his adoptive son and made him heir to the throne. Fearing for his life, Ngô Xương Ngập went into hiding with his retinue in Nam Sách (now Hải Dương province). Dương Tam Kha's reign was unpopular and many revolts and rebellions sprung up across the kingdom.

=== Ngô Xương Văn & Ngô Xương Ngập co-reign: 950–954 ===
Ngô Xương Văn (吳昌文) deposed Dương Tam Kha in 950 and styled himself "Nam Tấn Vương" (南晉王). Out of respect for his uncle, Ngô Xương Văn did not have him killed, but merely demoted him and sent him into exile. Ngô Xương Văn then searched out his older brother Ngô Xương Ngập in order to share the throne with him. After arriving at the capital, Ngô Xương Ngập styled himself "Thiên Sách Vương" (天策王). Brought back by his younger brother Ngô Xương Văn to the throne, Ngô Xương Ngập soon abused his rights as the oldest son and began to rule Tĩnh Hải quân as dictator, "Thiên Sách Vương" (天策王). The country was ripe for open rivalries between different lords who fought each other to become the next successor.

=== Ngô Xương Xí's reign: 965–968 ===
After Ngô Xương Văn's death in 965, his son Ngô Xương Xí (吳昌熾) succeeded him. Ascended to the throne, Ngô Xương Xí was faced with the daunting task of having his rule recognized in a period of open rivalry between the 12 lords who fought one another for control of the country. With the announcement of his rule, the country further disrupted and thrown into a chaotic period called the Anarchy of the 12 Warlords (Vietnamese: Loạn 12 sứ quân).

== Breakup and Civil war ==
=== "The Anarchy of the 12 Warlords" or "Loạn 12 sứ quân" (966–968) ===
The weakening of the Ngô dynasty's influence caused the revolt of some governors against the royal court. In 951, Duke Đinh Bộ Lĩnh of Hoa Lư district and son of the Governor of Hoan district Đinh Công Trứ, relied heavily on the difficult geography of his local mountainous region and started his rebellion against the Ngô dynasty. Both kings of Tĩnh Hải quân, Ngô Xương Văn & Ngô Xương Ngập launched military campaigns against Đinh Bộ Lĩnh. However, after more than a month, the Royal troops failed to succeed and returned to the capital and tried persuading Duke Đinh to give up. In 954, Ngô Xương Ngập died and the leader of Thao Gian district Chu Thái also started to betray Ngô dynasty. The King of Ngo, Ngô Xương Văn had used force to suppress the revolt and beheaded Chu Thái. In 965 Ngô Xương Văn was shot by a barrage of and so perished. His son, Ngô Xương Xí took up his leadership but the dynasty gradually fell into disarray. According to Khâm định Việt sử Thông giám cương mục, the Kiều clan and Dương clan revolted against the Ngô and in 966, the country was divided into 12 states and ruled by 12 warlords including the Ngô royalty (Ngô Xương Văn, Ngô Nhật Khánh).

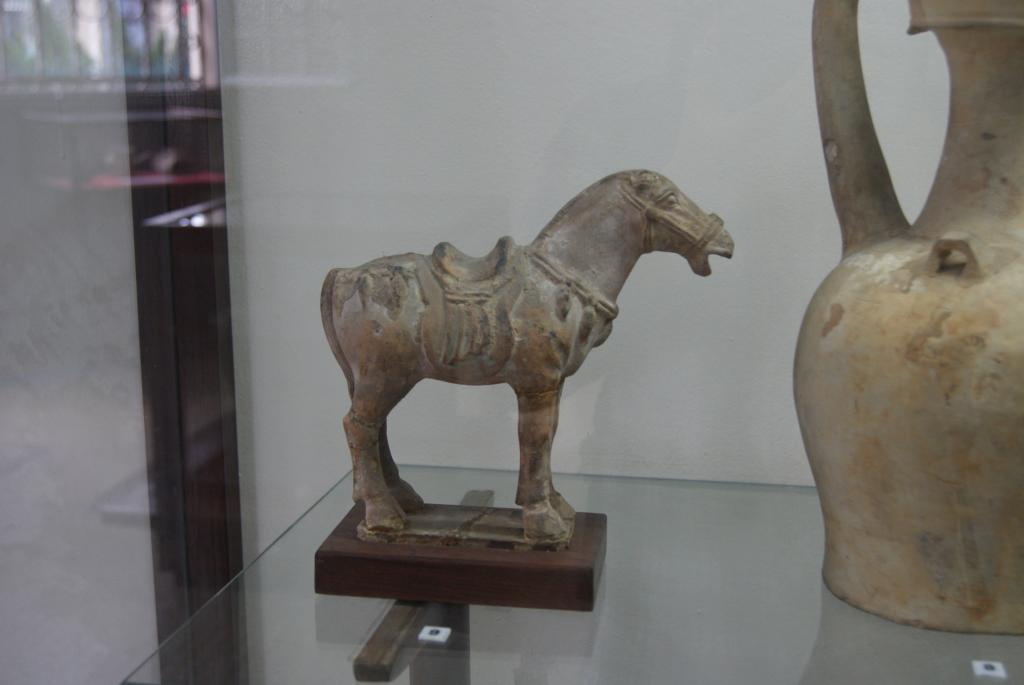
Ceramic of horse in 10 th century

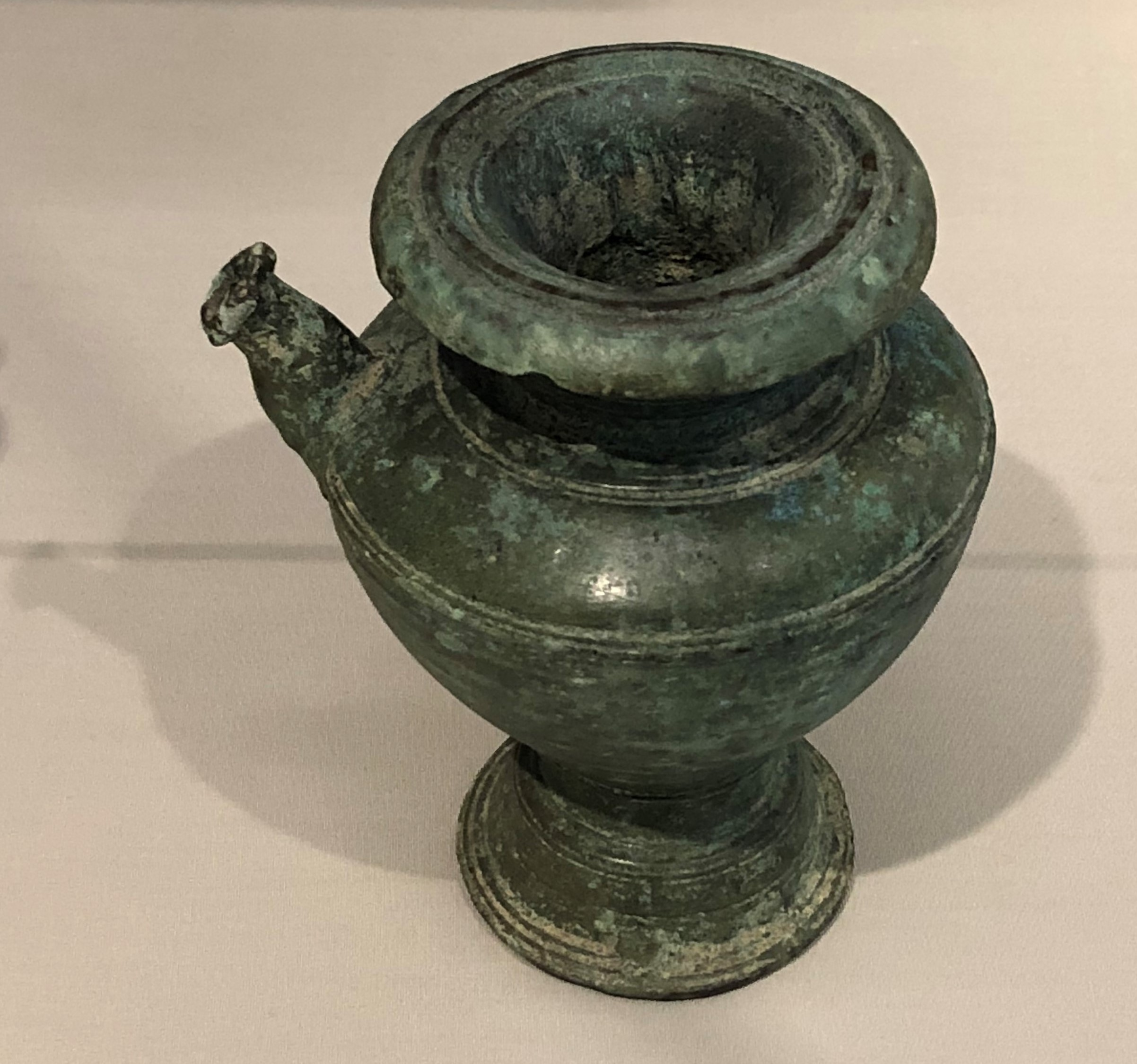
Bronze kettle in Ngô dynasty

After the submission of the royal clan in the 960s and to strengthen his position, Đinh Bộ Lĩnh married one of his daughters to the last Ngô king. He also married a younger sister of the Ngô king to his eldest son Ngô Nhật Khánh and took the Ngô queen mother as one of his wives. In 968, Đinh Bộ Lĩnh established a new kingdom of Dai Viet. Ngô Nhật Khánh quickly became a dissident and went into exile in Champa. When Đinh Bộ Lĩnh died in 979, Nhật Khánh persuaded the Cham king Paramesvaravarman I to raised a naval fleet to reclaim the throne, however the expedition was scuttled by a typhoon and Nhật Khánh drowned.

== Family tree ==
Family tree of the Ngô dynasty

Wu Rida (sinicized name); 8th century
Ngô Đình Mân; 9th century	Dương Đình Nghệ b.874–d.937
Ngô Tịnh ?–?	Ngô Quyền b.897-d.944 Ngô Vương r. 939－944	Dương Thị Ngọc	Dương Tam Kha d.980 Dương Bình Vương r. 944－950
Ngô Xương Ngập d.954 King of Thiên Sách r.950–954	Ngô Xương Văn b.925–d.965 King of Nam Tan r. 950－965	Ngô Chân Lưu b.933-d.1001
Ngô Xương Xí ?-? r. 965–966	Ngô Nhật Khánh d.979 Prince An
