= Jiǎo (surname) =

Chinese family name

Jiǎo (simplified Chinese: 矫; traditional Chinese: 矯; pinyin: Jiǎo) is a Chinese surname.

== Notable people ==
- Jiao Zhe, (矫喆) Chinese football player
- Jiaofu (矯父),
- Jiao Dayu (矯大羽), an internationally renowned watchmaker, watch appreciation and collector.
- Jiao Yan, Chinese football player.
- Jiao Gong Xian (矯公羨)
- Jiao Gong Han (矯公罕)
- Jiao Songsong (矯公罕), director of Chinese movie animation.
- Kiều Công Tiễn or Kiểu Công Tiện (pinyin: Jiǎo Gōngxiàn) (矯公羡) was a general in the court of Dương Đình Nghệ, a Vietnamese Jiedushi of Tĩnh Hải quân who took over the position in 931
