= Ngô Xương Xí =

Ngô Xương Xí 吳使君
- Head of the Ngô dynasty
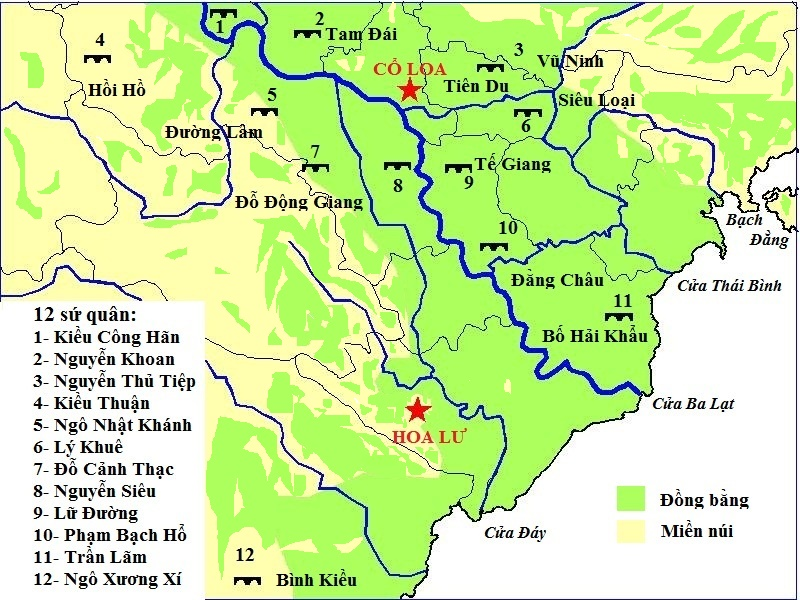
- 12 Warlords
- Reign: 965–968
- Predecessor: Ngô Xương Ngập (Ngô dynasty)
- Successor: Đinh Bộ Lĩnh (Đinh dynasty)
Regnal name
- Ngô Sứ quân (吳使君)
- Dynasty: Ngô
- Father: Ngô Xương Ngập

Ngô Xương Xí (chữ Hán: 吳昌熾, ?–968) was a Ngô dynasty crown prince and warlord of Vietnam during the Period of the 12 Warlords.

Xí was a son of King Ngô Xương Ngập, a co-ruler of Ngô dynasty. In 965, when his uncle, King Ngô Xương Văn was killed in the battle, Crown Prince Ngô Xương Xí became the head of the Ngô royal household. During the rise of a powerful warlord Đinh Bộ Lĩnh (丁部領), Ngô Xương Xí could not withstand direct military confrontations with the contending warlord Đinh Bộ Lĩnh's forces and had to retreat to Bình Kiều (modern Triệu Sơn District, Thanh Hóa Province), and there he was styled as Ngô Sứ Quân (吳使君) or "Warlord Ngô".

Xí was defeated by Đinh Bộ Lĩnh in 968. He was also the elder brother of Ngô Khuông Việt, who later became an influential Buddhist monk and politician during the Đinh dynasty.
