= Trần Lãm =

Vietnamese leader (d. 967)

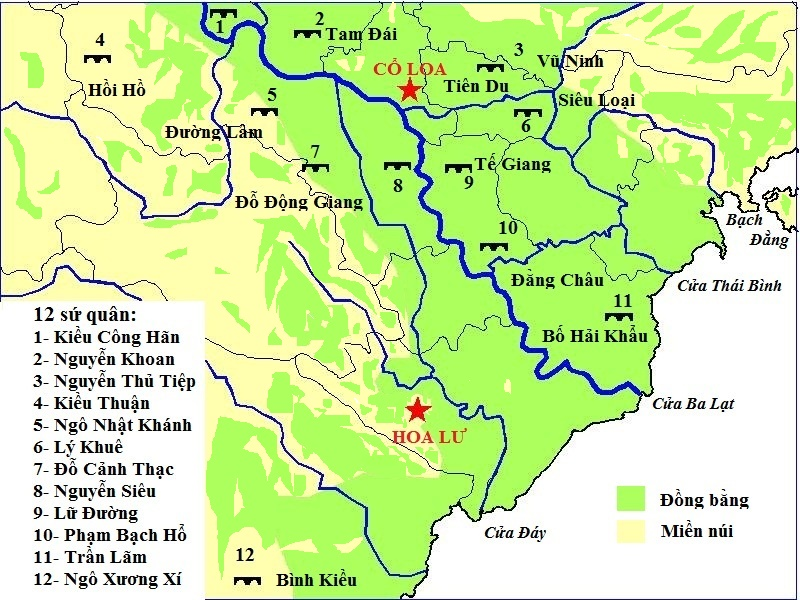
12 Warlords

Trần Lãm (chữ Hán: 陳覽, died 967) was a warlord of Vietnam during the Period of the 12 Warlords.

Lãm was an ethnic Việt. He held Bố Hải Khấu, Kỳ Bố, Thái Bình Province, and titled himself Trần Minh Công. He was one of strongest warlords of Vietnam in that time. Đinh Bộ Lĩnh swore allegiance to him, and became adoptive son of him. His territory and troops was annexed by Đinh Bộ Lĩnh after his death.
