= Lã Đường =

Vietnamese warlord

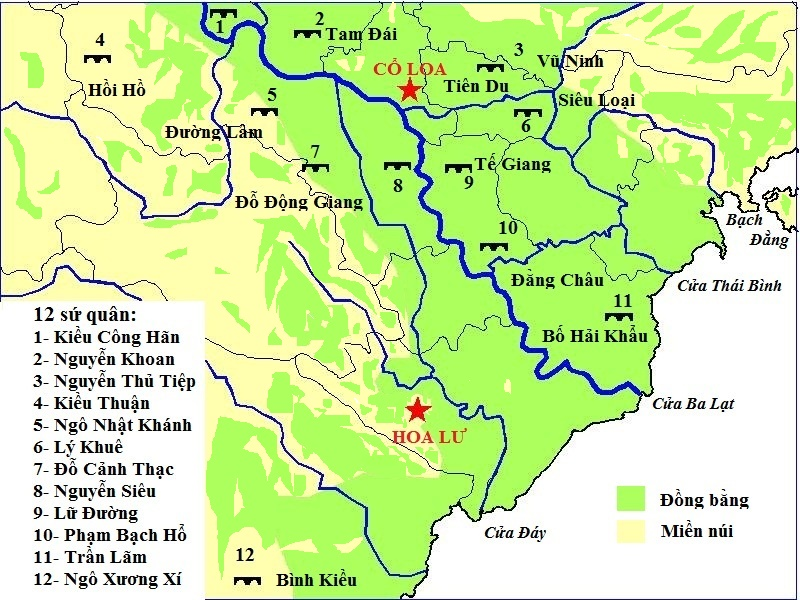
12 Warlords

Lã Đường (chữ Hán: 呂唐, 927–968) or Lữ Đường, was a warlord of Vietnam during the Period of the 12 Warlords.

He occupied Tế Giang (modern Văn Giang District, Hưng Yên Province), and titled himself Lã Tá Công (呂佐公). Later, he was defeated by Đinh Bộ Lĩnh.
