= Battle of Bạch Đằng (938) =

Naval battle between Tĩnh Hải quân and Southern Han on the Bạch Đằng River

Coordinates: 20.8442°N 106.6317°E

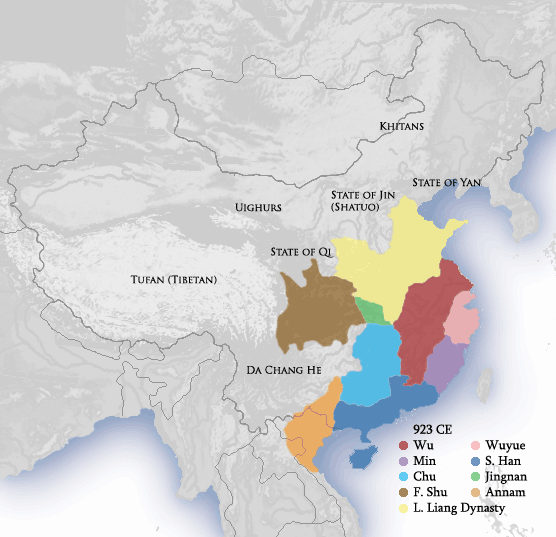
- Map of Tĩnh Hải quân (靜海軍) and Southern Han (南漢)
Date	December 938
Location	Bạch Đằng River, Vietnam
Result	Tĩnh Hải Quân victory

Belligerents
Tĩnh Hải quân	Southern Han

Commanders and leaders
Ngô Quyền; Dương Tam Kha; Kiều Công Hãn; Đỗ Cảnh Thạc	Liu Yan; Liu Hongcao †

Strength
5,000 - 10,000	20,000

Casualties and losses
Unknown	10,000

At the Battle of Bạch Đằng River in late 938 near Hạ Long Bay in northern Vietnam, the military force of the Viet-ruled domain of Tĩnh Hải quân, led by Ngô Quyền, a Viet lord, defeated the invading forces of the Chinese state of Southern Han and put an end to the Third Era of Northern Domination (Chinese ruled Vietnam). It was considered the turning point in Vietnamese history.

== Background ==
In October 930, Southern Han, a Chinese state in southern China during the Five Dynasties and Ten Kingdoms period, launched an attack on the Jinghai circuit, which at the time was a Viet principality controlled by the Khúc clan. The leader of the Khuc, Khúc Thừa Mỹ, was taken prisoner by the Southern Han emperor Liu Yan. In 931, the local general Dương Đình Nghệ raised a 3,000-men army of retainers and drove the Southern Han back to the borders of the Jinghai Circuit.

In 937, Đình Nghệ was assassinated by Kiều Công Tiễn, a military officer. Đình Nghệ's son-in-law and also his general, Ngô Quyền, mobilized his army to overthrow Kiều Công Tiễn. Công Tiễn asked Liu Yan for support. Liu Yan dispatched his son Liu Hongcao in command of the expedition fleet, which sailed to the Gulf of Tonkin and headed inland up Bạch Đằng River. Liu Yan led an additional force following his son's fleet.

== Battle ==
In late 938, the Southern Han fleet led by Liu Hongcao met Ngô Quyền's fleet on the gate of the Bạch Đằng River. The Southern Han fleet consisted fast warships carrying fifty men on each–twenty sailors, twenty five warriors, and two crossbowmen. Ngô Quyền and his force had set up massive stakes tipped with iron foiled points on the river bed. When the river tide rose, the sharpened stakes were covered by water. As the Southern Han sailed into the estuary, Viets in smaller crafts went down and harassed the Southern Han warships, luring them to follow upstream. When the tide fell, Ngô Quyền's force counterattacked and pushed the enemy fleet back to the sea. The Southern Han ships were immobilized by the stakes. Half of the Han army died, either killed or drowned, including Liu Hongcao. When the news of the defeat reached Liu Yan on the sea, he retreated back to Guangzhou.

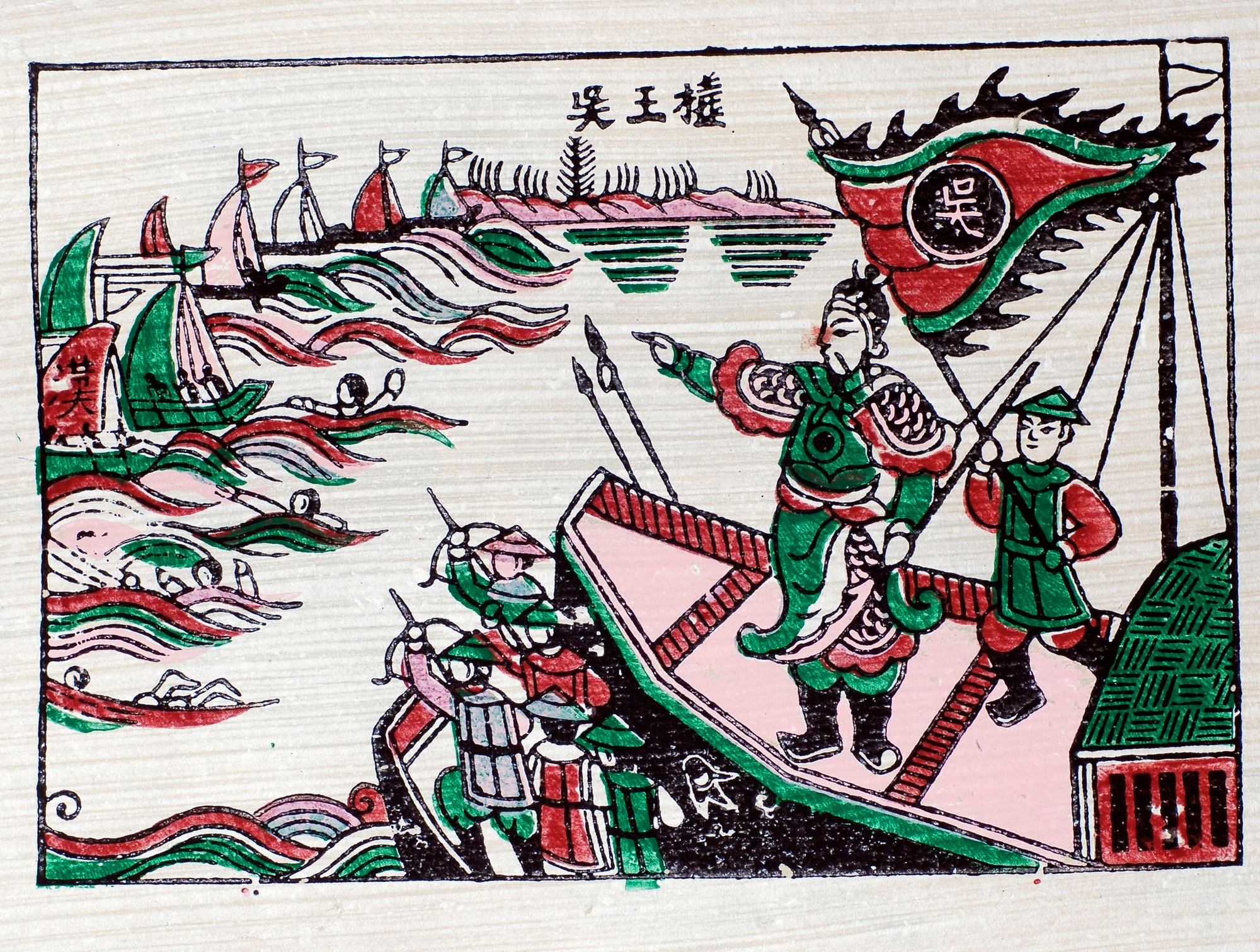
Đông Hồ woodblock depiction of Ngô Quyền leading his troops against Southern Han forces on the Bạch Đằng River, 938 AD

== Aftermath ==
In spring 939, Ngô Quyền proclaimed himself king and chose the town of Co Loa as the capital. This battle has been described as the point when Vietnamese history came into its own as the Jinghai Circuit achieved de facto independence.

== Legacy ==
In 1288, Commander-in-Chief Prince Trần Quốc Tuấn, inspired by Ngô Quyền, employed the same tactic against the Yuan Dynasty during the Battle of Bạch Đằng (1288). This engagement was a decisive Đại Việt victory and was one of the last major engagements in the Mongol invasions of Vietnam. Both battles are widely considered to be among the greatest victories in Vietnamese history.

== See also ==
- Battle of Bạch Đằng (1288)
