= Lý Khuê =

Vietnamese warlord

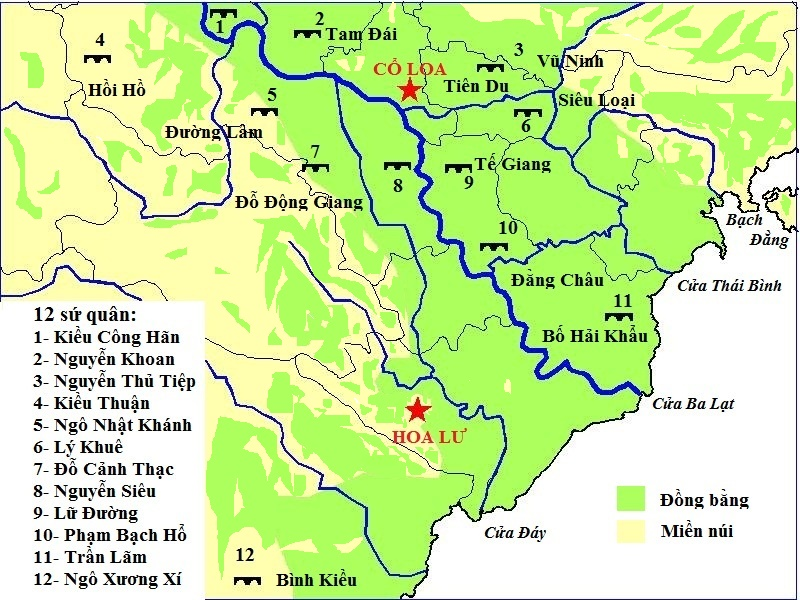
12 Warlords

Lý Khuê (chữ Hán: 李奎, died 968) was a warlord of Vietnam during the Period of the 12 Warlords.

He occupied Siêu Loại (modern Thuận Thành District, Bắc Ninh Province), and titled himself Lý Lãng Công (李郎公).

In 968, he was defeated by Lưu Cơ, a general of Đinh Bộ Lĩnh.
