= Triệu Sơn =

- Commune
- Interactive map of Triệu Sơn
- Coordinates: 19°49′19″N 105°36′08″E
- Country: Vietnam
- Region: North Central Coast
- Province: Thanh Hóa
- Established: 16 June 2025
- Administrative headquarters: 892 Lê Thái Tổ Street, Bà Triệu Hamlet

Area
  - Total: 41.09 km^{2} (15.86 sq mi)

Population (2024)
  - Total: 54,445
  - Density: 1,325/km^{2} (3,430/sq mi)
- Postal code: 41506
- Website: trieuson.thanhhoa.gov.vn

Triệu Sơn is a commune in Thanh Hóa province, Vietnam.

On 16 June 2025, Triệu Sơn district was dissolved as part of the 2025 Vietnamese administrative reform, which abolished the district-level administrative system. Triệu Sơn Commune was established under Resolution No. 1686/NQ-UBTVQH15 of the Standing Committee of the National Assembly of Vietnam, through the merger of the entire area and population of Triệu Sơn township and Minh Sơn, Dân Lực, Dân Lý, and Dân Quyền communes, formerly part of Triệu Sơn district. The commune officially began operating on 1 July 2025 and is an administrative unit directly under Thanh Hóa province. Triệu Sơn Commune comprises 47 hamlets.
