= Đỗ Cảnh Thạc =

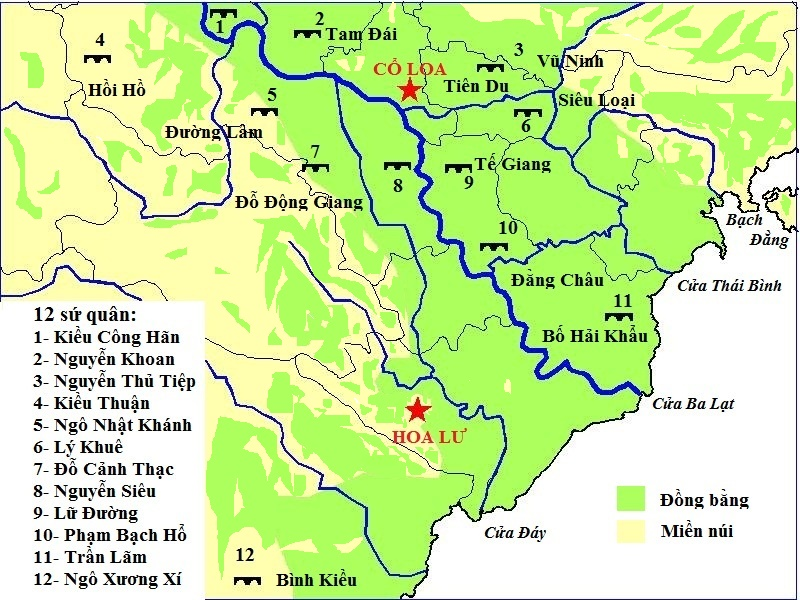
12 Warlords

Đỗ Cảnh Thạc (chữ Hán: 杜景碩, 912–967), formally Duke Cảnh (景公), was a warlord of Vietnam during the Period of the 12 Warlords.

Đỗ Cảnh Thạc was a Chinese from Guangling (in modern Yangzhou, Jiangsu Province). In 905, he was sent to put down the rebellion of Đường, Nguyễn together with Ngô Xương Văn and Dương Cát Lợi. Ngô Xương Văn was the second son of the former ruler Ngô Quyền. When their troops reached Từ Liêm, Văn persuaded his two colleagues to turn their armies back, and dethroned the usurper Dương Tam Kha.

After Ngô Xương Văn's death, Thạc occupied Đỗ Động Giang (modern Thanh Oai District, Hanoi), and titled himself Đỗ Cảnh Công (杜景公). Later, he was defeated by Đinh Bộ Lĩnh.
