= Ngô Xương Văn =

Ngô Xương Văn 吳昌文
- King of Jinghai

Grand Prince of Tĩnh Hải quân
- Reign: 950–965
- Predecessor: Dương Tam Kha
- Successor: Ngô Xương Xí (warlord)
- Co-king: Ngô Xương Ngập (Thiên Sách Vương, 950–954)
- Born: 935
- Died: 965
Names
- Ngô Xương Văn (吳昌文)
Regnal name
- Nam Tấn Vương (南晉王)
- Dynasty: Ngô
- Father: Ngô Quyền
- Mother: Dương Quốc mẫu

Ngô Xương Văn (chữ Hán: 吳昌文, 935–965), formally King of Nam Tấn (南晉王), was a king of the Vietnamese Ngô dynasty. He was the second son of Ngô Quyền, the dynastic founder.

== Background ==
Ngô Xương Văn was born in 935. According to Chinese source Historical Records of the Five Dynasties, his name was Ngô Xương Tấn (吳昌晉). King Ngô Quyền died in 944, and appointed Văn's elder brother Ngô Xương Ngập as successor. However, Ngập was banished and usurped by the regent Dương Tam Kha. In order to deceive the public, Văn was adopted by Dương Tam Kha.

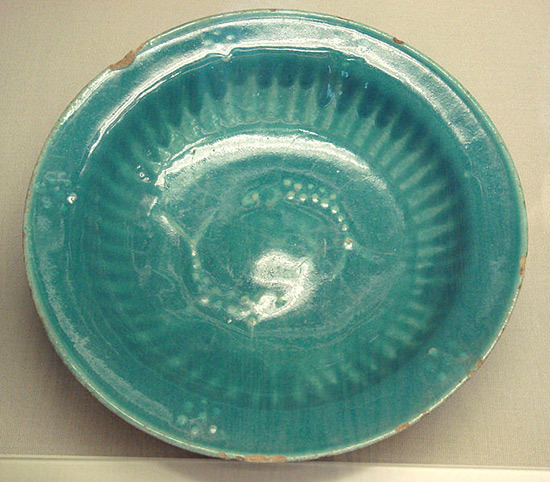
Abbasid ceramic bowl used by the Ngô prince, 940s, Museum of Hanoi

In 950, Văn was sent to put down the rebellion of Đường, Nguyễn together with Dương Cát Lợi and Đỗ Cảnh Thạc. When their troops reached Từ Liêm, Văn turned his army back, and dethroned Dương Tam Kha. Văn did not kill Dương Tam Kha and granted him the title Duke of Chương Dương (張楊公).

== Reign ==
Văn crowned himself Nam Tấn Vương (King of Nam Tấn), and summoned his elder brother Ngập to the capital. Ngập was appointed the co-ruler, and crowned Thiên Sách Vương (King of Thiên Sách). It was called một nước hai vua ("one country, two kings") in Vietnamese history. Both of them was known as Hậu Ngô Vương (後吳王). Ngập held the real power and Văn did not take part in any political affair until Ngập's death. The royal rule remained weak.

In 951, Duke Đinh Bộ Lĩnh rebelled and occupied Hoa Lư and did not pay tribute to the royal court. Văn and Ngập decided to attack him. They arrested Đinh Bộ Lĩnh's eldest son, Đinh Liễn, and ordered Bộ Lĩnh to surrender. Undeterred when they captured his son Đinh Liễn, Bộ Lĩnh replied in anger, “An honored warrior never gives up just because of his son,” and coolly ordered his archers “to shoot arrows at Liễn". The two kings were horrified and withdrew their troops.

After Ngập's death, Văn solicited the title of military governor from the Southern Han (without meeting their representatives), and he was granted the title Jiedushi of Tĩnh Hải quân (靜海軍節度使 Tĩnh Hải quân tiết độ sứ) and Governor of Annam (安南都護 An Nam đô hộ) by Southern Han. In 965, Văn led troops to put down the rebellion of Đường, Nguyễn, and was killed by an arrow in the midst of battle.

After his death, the kingdom fell into chaotic civil war, known as Anarchy of the 12 Warlords.

Ngô Xương Văn Ngô dynasty Born: 935 Died: 965
Preceded by Dương Tam Kha	King of Nam Việt; 950–965 concurrently with Ngô Xương Ngập: 950–954	Succeeded by Ngô Xương Xí (warlord); Anarchy of the 12 Warlords
