= Triệu Sơn district =

Coordinates: 19.817°N 105.583°E

Triệu Sơn district Huyện Triệu Sơn
- District
- Interactive map of Triệu Sơn district
- Country: Vietnam
- Region: North Central Coast
- Province: Thanh Hóa
- Capital: Triệu Sơn

Area
  - Total: 113 sq mi (292 km^{2})

Population (2018)
  - Total: 230,200
- Time zone: UTC+7 (UTC + 7)

Triệu Sơn is a former district (huyện) of Thanh Hóa province in the North Central Coast region of Vietnam.

As of 2003 the district had a population of 213,115. The district covers an area of 292 km^{2} (113 sq mi). The district capital lies at Triệu Sơn.
