= Dương Tam Kha =

King of the Ngô dynasty 944–950

Dương Tam Kha 楊三哥
- Bình vương

King of Tĩnh Hải quân
- Reign: 944–950
- Predecessor: Ngô Quyền
- Successor: Ngô Xương Ngập and Ngô Xương Văn
- Born: ? Tĩnh Hải quân
- Died: 10 August 980; Bố Hải, Tĩnh Hải quân
Names
- Dương Tam Kha (楊三哥); Dương Chủ Tướng (楊主將); Dương Thiệu Hồng (楊紹洪)
Regnal name
- Bình vương (平王)
- Dynasty: Ngô
- Father: Dương Đình Nghệ

Dương Tam Kha (楊三哥) or Dương Tam Ca, formally King Bình of Dương (楊平王), later known as the Duke of Chương Dương (章陽公) (died 10 August 980), was king of the Ngô dynasty from 944 to 950.

== Early years ==
Dương Tam Kha was one of Dương Đình Nghệ's sons, brother of Ngô Quyền's wife, empress Dương. According to Đại Việt sử lược (History annals of Dai Viet), his birth name was Dương Chủ Tướng (楊主將), but according to History of Song, his name was Dương Thiệu Hồng (楊紹洪). Some historians claimed that he was the third son of Dương Đình Nghệ, after Dương Nhất Kha and Dương Nhị Kha.

== As a subordinate general ==
He was a subordinate general of Khúc Hạo in the area of Aizhou (now Thanh Hóa Province). In 931, Dương Đình Nghệ defeated Southern Han ruler Li Tian, retook the capital of Đại La (former name of Hanoi), proclaimed himself Jiedushi (equivalent to Military governor) of Tĩnh Hải quân. Dương Tam Kha became a subordinate general of his father.

Six years later, Kiều Công Tiễn, also a general of Dương Đình Nghệ, mutinied and killed his master in order to become governor of Jinghao. In 938, Ngô Quyền, son-in-law and also former general of Dương Đình Nghệ defeated the potency of Kiều Công Tiễn and also killed him. After that, Dương Tam Kha follow Ngô Quyền as his general.

As the Ngô Quyền march his forces to Đại La, Kiều Công Tiễn sent the envoys to Southern Han to petition for sending army to help himself. Emperor of Southern Han, Liu Yan, commissioned his son, Liu Hongcao to help Kiều Công Tiễn, he also led another army to supply his son. But Công Tiễn was executed before this army arrived. In the November 938, at the Battle of Bạch Đằng, the fleet was defeated by Ngô Quyền, Liu Hongcao was killed in battle. Dương Tam Kha participated in this battle.

== Mutiny and accession ==
In 944, before his death, Ngô Quyền had Dương Tam Kha become regent for his son, Ngô Xương Ngập. But after the demise of Ngô Quyền, he forced his maternal nephew to abdicate and installed himself as king, calling himself Dương Bình Vương (King Ping of Yang). Ngô Xương Ngập fled to Trà Hương village (modern Hải Dương Province) and was hidden by a chieftain (Hào trưởng) of area named Phạm Lệnh Công. Hào trưởng is a title for a honored man who is leader of his kin and also of a large area around his base during early independent Vietnam. Thanks to his efforts, Ngô Xương Ngập was in safety. Afterward, Dương Tam Kha adopted Ngô Xương Văn, the second son of Ngô Quyền. During his reign, prospered economically and freely developed its own regional culture that continues to this day. He developed the coastal kingdom's agriculture, built seawalls, expanded crops in Hà Tây, dredged rivers and lakes, and encouraged sea transport and trade in Nam Định.

In 950, Dương Tam Kha forced Ngô Xương Văn to quell the rebellion of two villages Đường and Nguyễn in Thái Bình Province, but he turned his army to dethrone Dương Tam Kha. Although Dương Tam Kha dethroned his brother after the death of his father, Ngô Xương Văn spared, but degraded him to Duke of Chương Dương.

== Later years ==
He spent his later years reclaiming new land called Giao Thủy (Nam Định) with his family and followers. Some historic evidence showed that he was the father of Empress Dương Vân Nga who married Đinh Bộ Lĩnh in 966. She would eventually become the last ruler of the Đinh family who would rule as dowager empress in her son's name, eventually giving rise to the Lê family through her marriage to Lê Hoàn in 980.

== Family ==
- Father
  - Dương Đình Nghệ (874–937)
- Sister
  - Dương Thị Ngọc
- Niece
  - Dương Vân Nga (952–1000)

Dương Tam Kha Ngô dynasty Died: 950
Preceded by Ngô Quyền	King of Nam Việt; 944 to 950	Succeeded by Ngô Xương Ngập and Ngô Xương Văn
