= Kiều Công Tiễn =

- Tĩnh Hải quân tiết độ sứ

Jiedushi of Tĩnh Hải quân (self-proclaimed)
- Tenure: 937–938
- Predecessor: Dương Đình Nghệ
- Successor: Ngô Quyền (as the Grand Prince)
- Pretender: Liu Hongcao (938, appointed by Southern Han)
- Born: 870; Phong châu, Tĩnh Hải quân, Tang China (present-day Phú Thọ province, Vietnam)
- Died: 938 (aged 67–68); Đại La citadel
Names
- Kiều Công Tiễn (矯公羡) or Kiểu Công Tiện (皎公羡)

Kiều Công Tiễn (chữ Hán: 矯公羡) (870–938) was a general in the court of Dương Đình Nghệ, a Vietnamese Jiedushi of Tĩnh Hải quân who took over the position in 931. In 937, Kiều Công Tiễn assassinated the Jiedushi to seize his position and thus provoked a revolt led by Ngô Quyền who sought revenge his lord and father-in-law Dương Đình Nghệ. In response to the attack, Kiều Công Tiễn appealed to Liu Yan, the emperor of Southern Han, for reinforcements but he was defeated and executed by Ngô Quyền before the army of Southern Han entered the country. Ngô Quyền subsequently won a decisive victory over the Southern Han in the Battle of Bạch Đằng River and would go on to inaugurate the continuous independence of Vietnam for the first time in nearly a thousand years.

== History ==
According to Từ điển Bách khoa toàn thư Việt Nam, the date of birth of Kiều Công Tiễn was unknown but he was from Phong Châu (now Phú Thọ, Vietnam) where he was a notable of the region. Commonly, the chữ Hán characters of his name (矯公羨) are transcribed in Vietnamese as Kiều Công Tiễn but there are some sources such as the Khâm định Việt sử thông giám cương mục or the Việt Nam sử lược of Trần Trọng Kim use the transcription Kiểu Công Tiện. In several ancient historical books of China like the New History of the Five Dynasties, his family name (矯, Kiều) was recorded by another character 皎 which is often transcribed as Kiểu in Vietnamese.

When Dương Đình Nghệ took over the position of Jiedushi of Tĩnh Hải quân in 931 from the Southern Han, Kiều Công Tiễn was chosen as a general in the court of Dương Đình Nghệ, according to the Đại Việt sử lược, Kiều Công Tiễn was the adopted son of the Jiedushi. In the third month of lunar calendar in 937, Kiều Công Tiễn assassinated Dương Đình Nghệ in order to seize his position of Jiedushi. Nine months later, Ngô Quyền, another general of Dương Đình Nghệ, commanded his army from the Ái province (now Thanh Hóa) to rise a revolt against Kiều Công Tiễn in revenging his lord and father-in-law Dương Đình Nghệ. In response to Ngô Quyền's military campaign, Kiều Công Tiễn decided to seek help from the emperor of Southern Han Liu Yan who also wanted to profit the chaos in Tĩnh Hải quân to regain control of Giao Chỉ. Because of his action against Dương Đình Nghệ and the call on Chinese aid, Kiễu Công Tiễn is denounced by many Vietnamese historians as a usurper in history of Vietnam.

After accepting the appeal of Kiều Công Tiễn, Liu Yan appointed his son Liu Yuancao the new Jiedushi of Tĩnh Hải quân, which was renamed as King of Giao Chỉ (Giao vương), and personally conducted the reinforcements for Kiều Công Tiễn. Before the troops of Southern Han entered the territory of Tĩnh Hải quân, Ngô Quyền got ahead by defeating and executing Kiều Công Tiễn in 938 and prepared to catch the army of Liu Yan in Bạch Đằng River. Finally Liu Yan's army was defeated in the Battle of Bạch Đằng River where his son Liu Yuancao was killed in action, the emperor of Southern Han had to abandon his military campaign and Ngô Quyền thus successfully secured the country from invaders and marked the beginning of the independence of Vietnam from Chinese authorities. After the death of Ngô Quyền in 944, Vietnam again fell into troubled times with the 12 Lords Rebellion in which Kiều Công Hãn and Kiều Thuận, grandsons of Kiều Công Tiễn, were among the principal warlords.

Kiều Công Tiễn Born: ? Died: 938
Regnal titles
Preceded by Dương Đình Nghệ	Jiedushi of Tĩnh Hải quân 937–938	Succeeded by Ngô Quyền as Grand Prince
