= Liu Hongcao =

Liu Hongcao (Chinese: 劉弘操, Vietnamese: Lưu Hoằng Tháo, died 938) was an imperial prince of the Chinese Five Dynasties and Ten Kingdoms Period state Southern Han.

He was the ninth son of emperor Liu Yan and received the title of Prince of Wan (萬王) in 932.

In 937, Dương Đình Nghệ, the ruler of Tĩnh Hải quân, was killed by his general Kiều Công Tiễn. Ngô Quyền, who was Nghệ's son-in-law, mobilized his army against Tiễn. Tiễn requested help from Southern Han. Liu Yan decided to annex Tĩnh Hải quân, so he granted Liu Hongcao the title Prince of Jiao (交王, Giao vương, "Prince of Giao Chỉ"), and dispatched him to Vietnam. Liu Yan himself commanded a follow-up army. In the next year, the army of Southern Han was defeated by Ngô Quyền in Bạch Đằng River, and Hongcao was killed in the battlefield. Hearing the news, Liu Yan cried bitterly and withdrew his own fleet.
