= Khuông Việt =

Vietnamese Buddhist monk and poet

Ngô Chân Lưu (chữ Hán: 吳真流, 933–1011), title Khuông Việt (匡越), was a Vietnamese Buddhist monk and poet.

He wrote some of the earliest works by any Vietnamese writer, but wrote in Chinese, the language of the Vietnamese literati and Confucian scholars. His Ngọc Lang Quy (玉郎歸), a farewell to Lý Giác, is one of the first works of Chữ Nho tradition of Vietnamese literature.
