= Ngô Quyền =

10th-century king of Vietnam

Ngô Quyền 吳權
- Ngô Vương
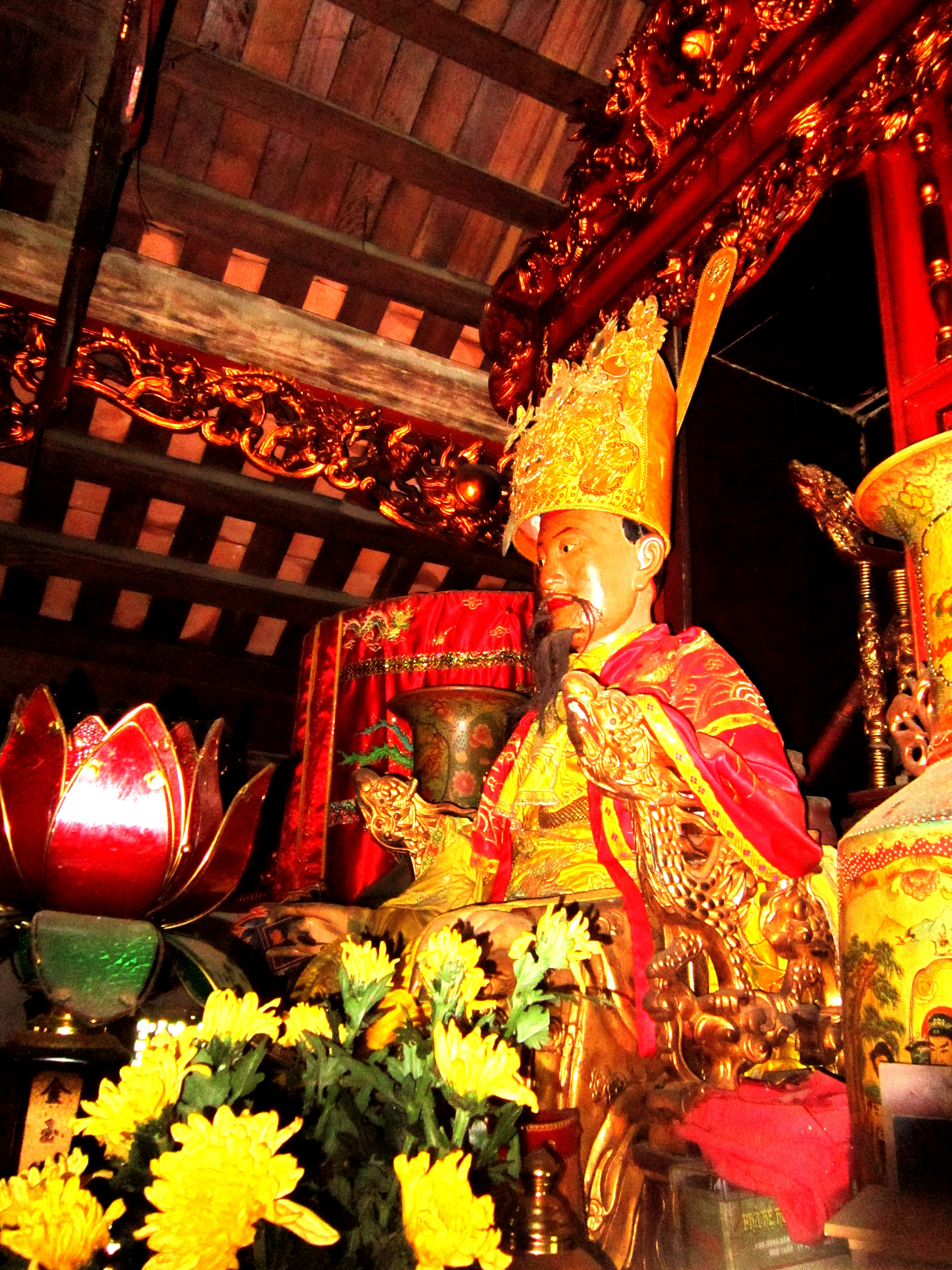
- Ngô Quyền's statue in Haiphong

Jiedushi of Tĩnh Hải quân
- Reign: 938–939
- Predecessor: Kiều Công Tiễn
- Successor: himself as King of Ngô Dynasty

King of Ngô dynasty
- Reign: 1 February 939 – 14 February 944
- Predecessor: Dynasty established
- Successor: Dương Tam Kha
- Born: 17 April 898; Đường Lâm, Tĩnh Hải quân, Tang China
- Died: 14 February 944 (aged 45); Cổ Loa, Ngô dynasty
- Burial: 18 April 944; Tomb of Ngô Quyền (in modern Đường Lâm, Sơn Tây, Hanoi)
- Spouse: Dương Phương Lan; Dương Như Ngọc; Đỗ phi
- Issue: Prince of Thiên Sách Ngô Xương Ngập; Prince of Nam Tấn Ngô Xương Văn; Ngô Nam Hưng; Ngô Càn Hưng
Names
- Ngô Quyền (吳權)
Regnal name
- Ngô Vương (吳王)
- Dynasty: Ngô
- Father: Ngô Mân
- Mother: Phùng Thị Tinh Phong
- Religion: Buddhism

- Ngô Quyền
- Vietnamese alphabet: Ngô Quyền
- Chữ Hán: 吳權

- Formal name
- Vietnamese alphabet: Ngô Vương
- Chữ Hán: 吳王

Ngô Quyền (chữ Hán: 吳權) (17 April 898 – 14 February 944), often referred to as Tiền Ngô Vương (前吳王; "First King of Ngô"), was a warlord who later became the founding king of the Ngô dynasty of Vietnam. He reigned from 939 to 944. In 938, he defeated the Southern Han dynasty at the Battle of Bạch Đằng River north of modern Haiphong. The battle is celebrated in Vietnamese national history as it ended 1,000 years of Chinese rule over Vietnam dating back to 111 BC under the Western Han dynasty. A central district in modern Haiphong is named after him.

== Early life and career ==
Ngô Quyền was born in 898 AD in Đường Lâm (modern-day Sơn Tây district, Hanoi of northern Vietnam) during the Tang dynasty. He was the son of Ngô Mân, an influential official in Phong, Annan (today Phú Thọ province). Ngô Mân's ancestor was Wu Ridai (Ngô Nhật Đại), a local tribal chief from Fuluzhou, Annan (Modern-day Hà Tĩnh province). In 722, Wu Ridai and his family migrated to Aizhou (Modern-day Thanh Hóa province) after the defeat of Mai Thúc Loan. According to the family's stele erected in 1631, the family claimed to have dated back to the Hung kings period. Ngô Quyền's birth, according to Vietnamese tradition, that he was bathed with strange luminosity while three strange black moles were seen on the baby's back, were signs of his future greatness, and the mother named him "Quyền", meaning authority and power.

Since 905, the Tang dynasty lost control of Jinghai to locals and native chieftains. The Khúc clan ruled Annam independently until in 930 the Chinese kingdom of Southern Han invaded Jinghai and removed the Khúc family from power. A formal vassal of the Khúc family, Dương Đình Nghệ launched a revolt in 931 that ousted the Chinese.

In 931, he served under Dương Đình Nghệ (the governor of Jinghai circuit/principality) and quickly rose through the military ranks and government administration; by 934, he was promoted to the post of military governor of Ái Châu. Dương Đình Nghệ loved his talent and gave him one of his daughters, Lady Dương, in marriage and placed him in charge of Ái Châu (Nghệ An province at present). The province was Dương Đình Nghệ's hometown and military power base. By giving Ngô Quyền command of this region Dương Đình Nghệ recognized Ngô Quyền's loyalty and talent.

After Dương Đình Nghệ was assassinated in a military coup in 937 by a usurper named Kiều Công Tiễn, he took control of the military and was well received. That same year, Ngô Quyền's forces defeated the rebel Kiều Công Tiễn and had him executed. This transpired into an opportunistic pretense for wrestling control of Annam by the new Southern Han regime due to its strategic geographical location. Ngô Quyền foresaw the Southern Han intention. He quickly mobilized the armed forces and made war preparations well in advance. His victory at the Battle of Bạch Đằng paved the way for Vietnamese independence.

== Defeating the Southern Han ==
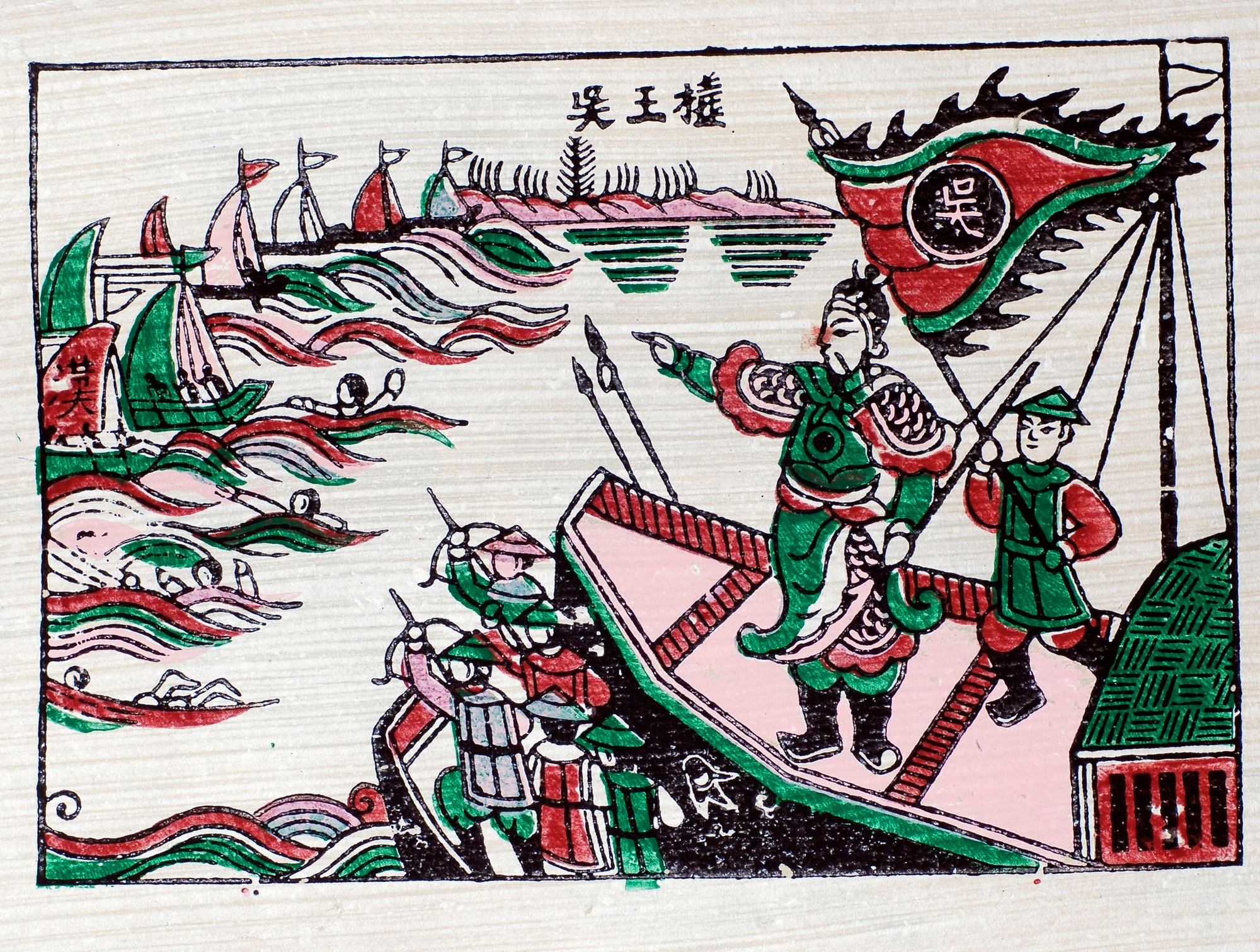
Đông Hồ woodblock depiction of Ngô Quyền leading his troops against Southern Han forces on the Bạch Đằng River, 938 AD

In 938, the Southern Han emperor Liu Yan dispatched a naval fleet to subdue Jinghai. Ngô Quyền calculated that the Southern Han would sail down the Bạch Đằng River to unload their troops right in the middle of Giao Châu to do the most damage. To prevent this incursion, Ngô Quyền strategized and ordered the waters of Bạch Đằng embedded with thousands of large wooden pikes hidden just beneath the rising tide water. He used boats with shallow drafts to instigate and lure the Southern Han toward the traps after the tide had risen. When the hundreds of Southern Han ships were punctured and caught against the deadly traps, Ngô Quyền led his forces in the attack. Hundreds of trapped ships were burned and sabotaged and thousands of Southern Han soldiers were killed, while some managed to retreat and were chased out relentlessly by the forces of An Nam. In the thick of battle, most of the Southern Han army, including the Admiral Liu Hongcao (the prince of the Southern Han Emperor), were killed. Similar tactics were later repeated by Lê Hoàn in 981 and Trần Hưng Đạo against the Mongols in 1288.

== King of Annam (Tĩnh Hải Quân) ==
After overthrowing the Chinese government in Vietnam and proclaimed as king, Ngô Quyền transferred the capital to Cổ Loa citadel, the capital of Âu Lạc, the ancient Yue kingdom, thus affirming the continuity of the traditions of the Lạc Việt people. He strengthened old rituals, and also provided feathered accessories, yellow banners, brass gongs, and deerskin drums for all the ancient dances with sword and battle axe, reminiscent of scenes depicted on Đông Sơn drums. However, despite having defeated Southern Han, Quyền also imposed a Chinese style administration that followed Chinese etiquette down to the color of dress that was worn.

His new realm quickly succumbed to prolonged civil conflict, beginning with internecine struggles between members of the Dương and Ngô families, who continued to alternate in power until the mid-960s. Ngô Quyền's immediate heirs proved unable to maintain a unified state. After his death in 944, Dương Tam Kha usurped the throne for a brief time, until Ngô Quyền's two sons, Ngô Xương Văn and Ngô Xương Ngập, finally established a joint rule, which lasted until the collapse of the royal family in 966.

== Family ==
- Father
  - Ngô Mân
- Mother
  - Phùng Thị Tinh Phong
- Wife
  - Dương Thị Ngọc
- Brother-in-law
  - Dương Tam Kha (?–980)
- Children
  - Ngô Xương Ngập (?–954)
  - Ngô Xương Văn (935–965)
  - Ngô Nam Hưng
  - Ngô Càn Hưng

== Legacy ==
The first history of Đại Việt by Lê Văn Hưu (13th century), Anthology of Palace Spirits of Lý Tế Xuyên (14th century), and successive histories all recognized the importance of Ngô Quyền.

"The Battle of Bach-dang River took place in the autumn of 938. It has been remembered by the Vietnamese as an important milestone on their path to national independence. It had a powerful effect on the people of the time, as well, for it directly led to the abandonment of T'ang-style political titles and to the proclamation of the first Vietnamese "king" of the tenth century."

— K. W. Taylor

== Image ==
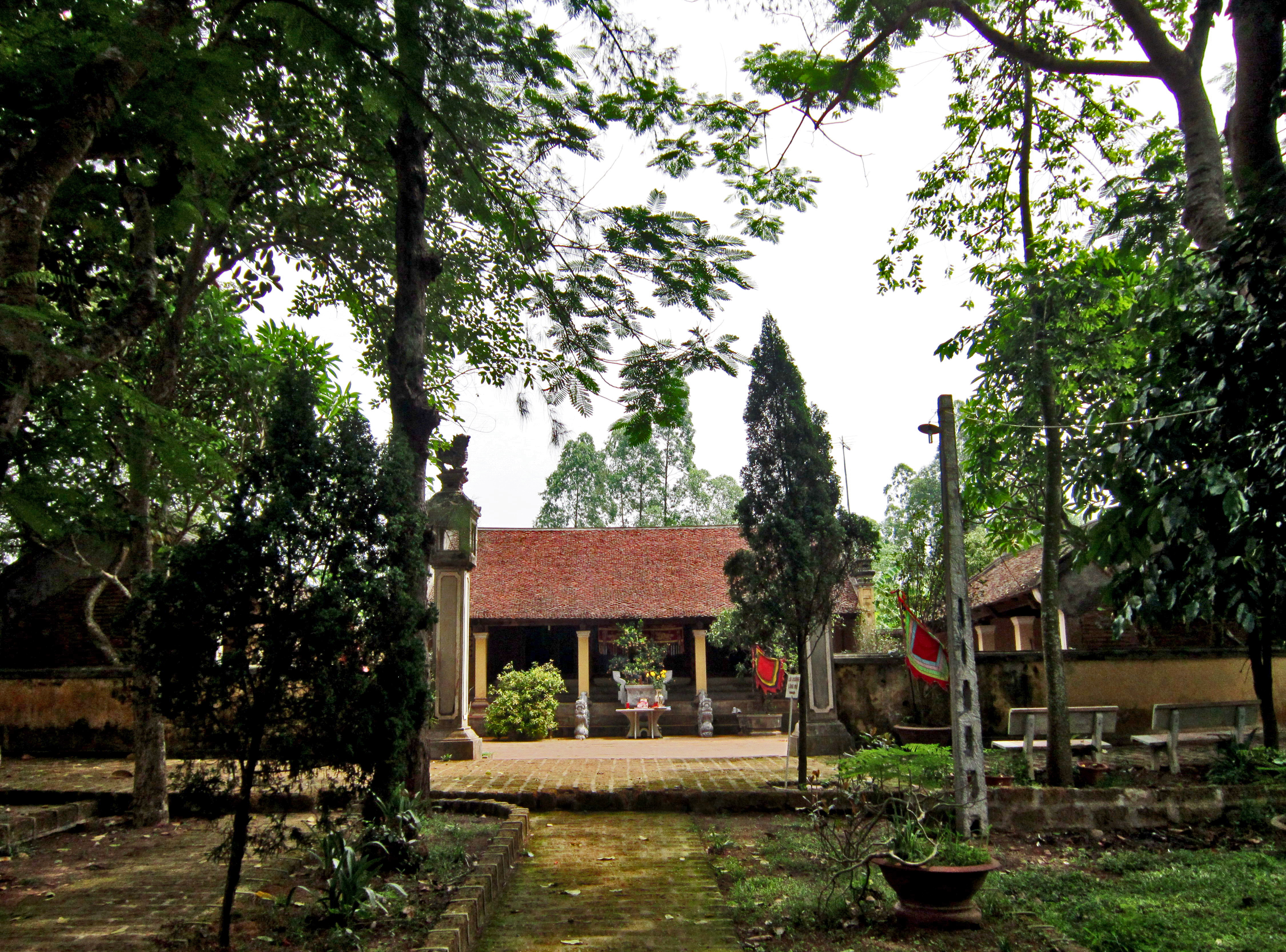
Ngô Quyền's temple in Cam Lâm village.

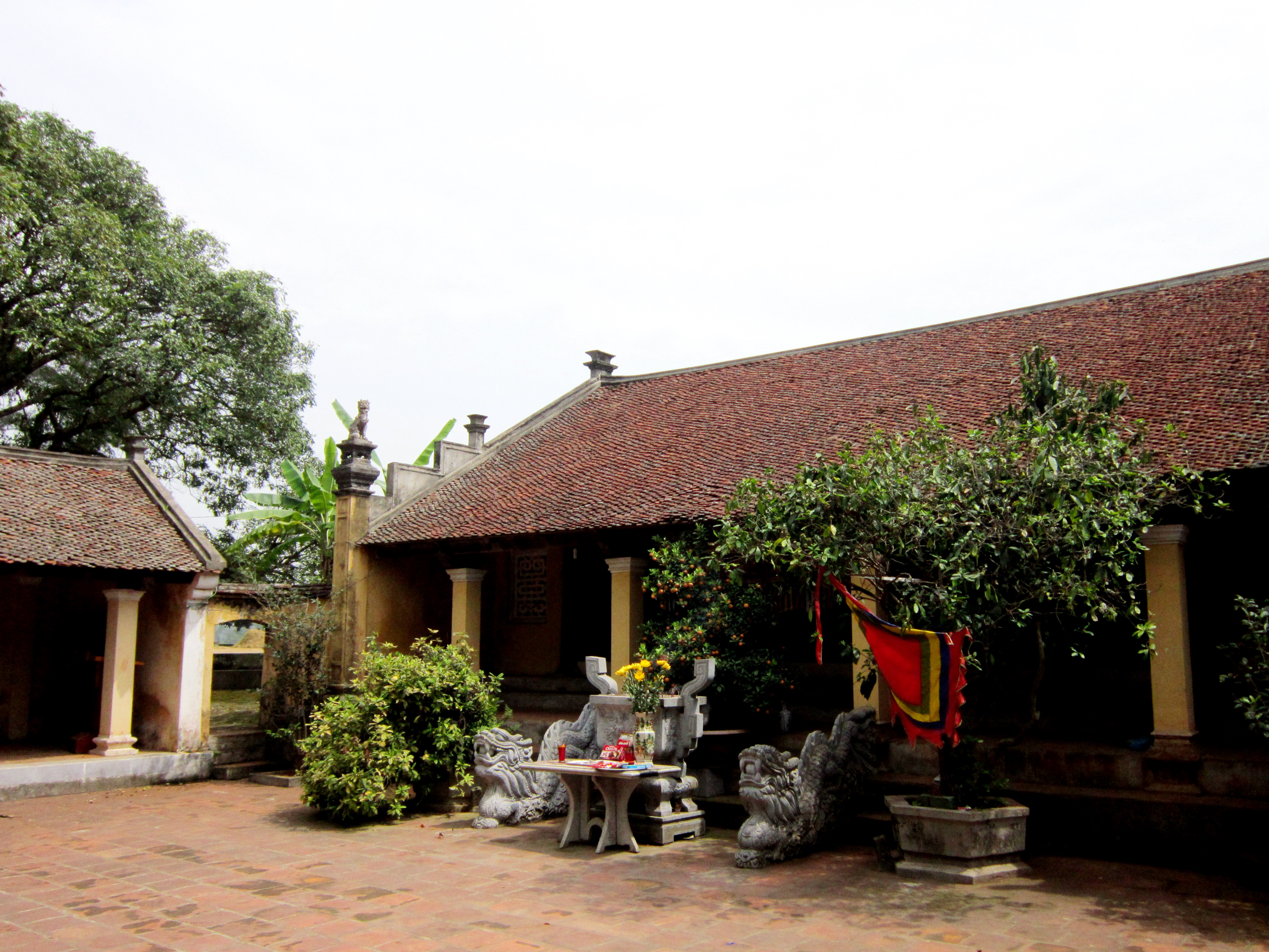
Ngô Quyền's temple

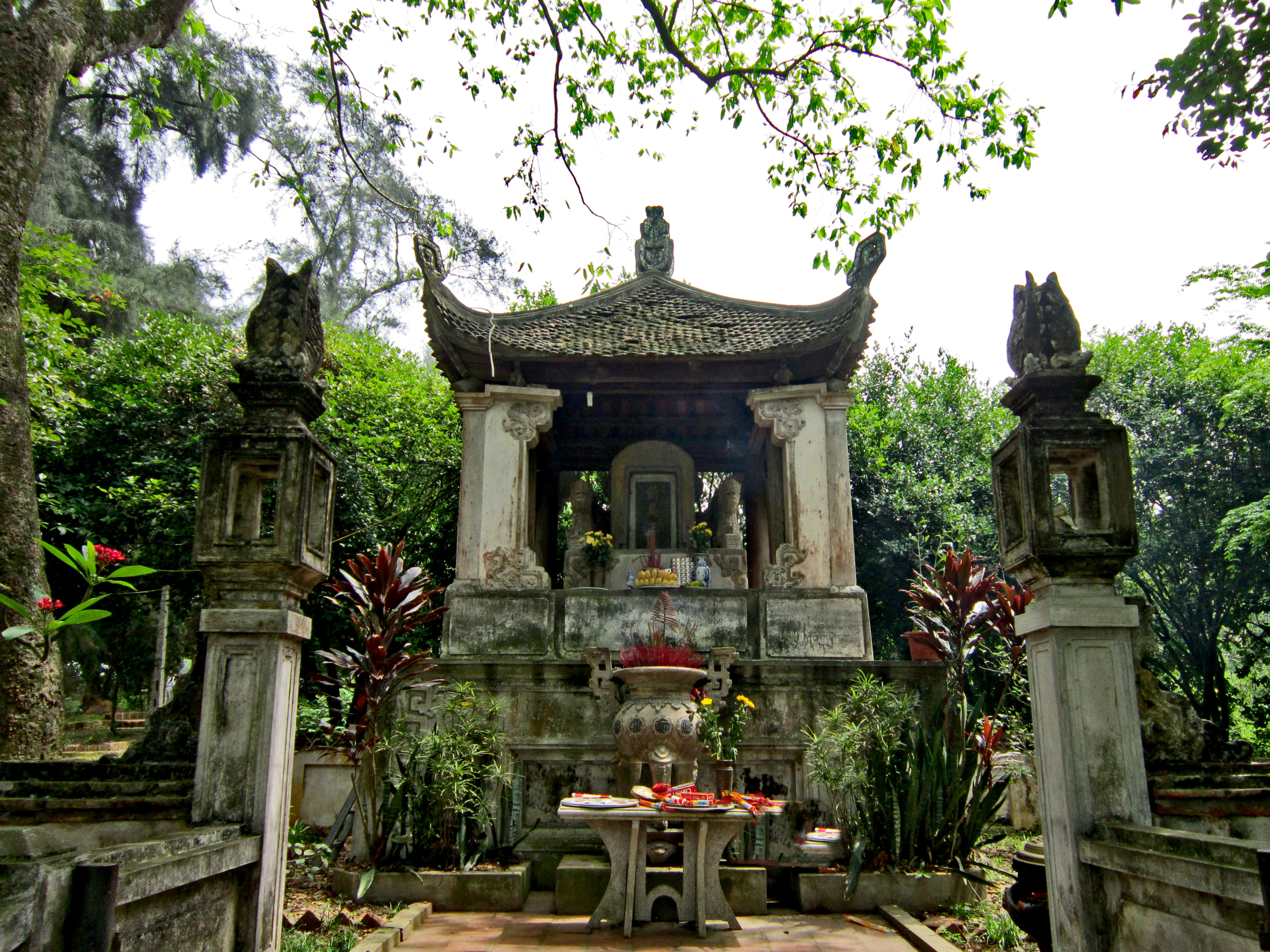
Shrine of Ngô Quyền.

Ngô Quyền Ngô dynasty Born: 897 Died: 944
Preceded by Kiều Công Tiễn as governor of Tĩnh Hải quân	King of Jinghai; 939–944	Succeeded by Dương Tam Kha
