= Citadel of Cổ Loa =

Archaeological site in Vietnam

Coordinates: 21.113408°N 105.873206°E

Cổ Loa Citadel is an ancient fortified city and archaeological site in present-day Hanoi's Đông Anh District, roughly 17 kilometers north of Hanoi, in the upper plain north of the Red River. Relics of the Bronze Age Phùng Nguyên culture and Đông Sơn culture have been found in Cổ Loa. It might be the first political center of the Vietnamese civilization. The settlement’s concentric walls resemble a snail’s shell; it had an outer embankment covering 600 hectares.

== Etymology ==
The name "Cổ Loa" is Sino-Vietnamese reading of 古螺 (< Middle Chinese (ZS) kuo^{X}-luɑ > Standard Chinese: gǔ luó), literally meaning "ancient spiral". According to Đại Việt Sử Ký Toàn Thư, the citadel is shaped like a snail, reflecting of the citadel's multi-layered structure with concentric ramparts and moats.

== History ==
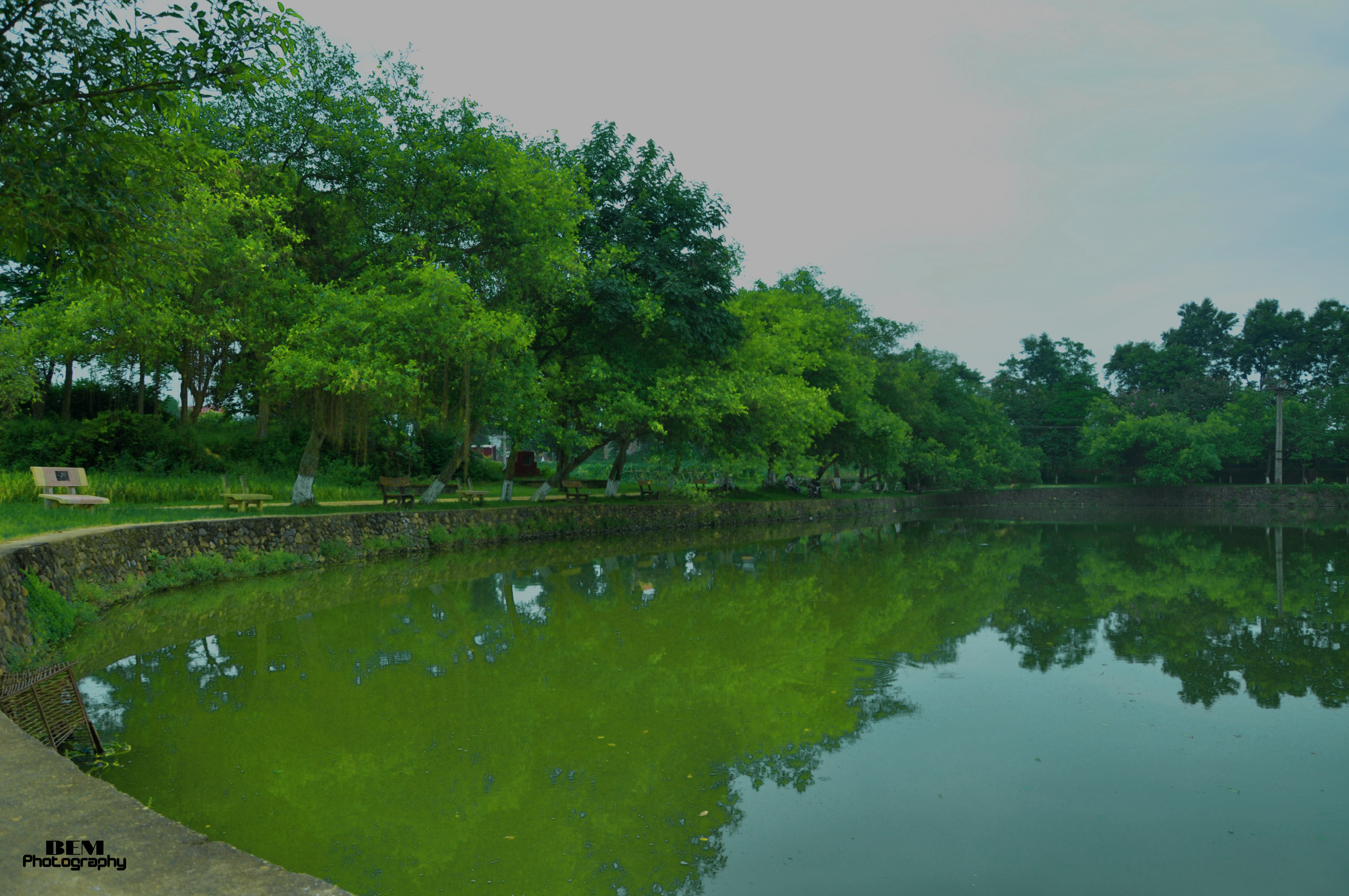
The well of Trọng Thủy at Cổ Loa

Cổ Loa is closely associated with An Dương Vương, the king of Âu Lạc. After defeating the Hùng king of Văn Lang, An Dương Vương ordered to construct the fortified city, which is spiral-shaped like a snail.

There are many legends surrounding the construction of this fortress. According to the legend of the Golden Turtle, when the city was being built, all the work during the day was mysteriously undone by spirits led by a thousand-year-old white chicken. In response to the An Dương Vương's plea, a giant golden turtle (Kim Quy) emerged from the water and protected the King until the city's completion. Kim Quy gave the King one of his claws before leaving and instructed him to make a crossbow using it as a trigger, assuring him he would be invincible with it. A man called Cao Lỗ was tasked to create that crossbow, which was then called "Master Crossbow of the Divinely Luminous Golden Claw" (靈光金爪神弩; Linh Quang Kim Trảo Thần Nỏ).

In the "Legend of Trọng Thủy and Mị Châu", Trọng Thủy was a prince of Nam Việt who was married Mị Châu, the only daughter of An Dương Vương. But Mị Châu unwittingly betrayed her father, giving away the secret of the Turtle Claw Crossbow to Trọng Thủy and leading to the fall of Cổ Loa fortress to Nam Việt kingdom.

In 939, King Ngô Quyền enthroned at Cổ Loa. The city again became the capital of the Vietnamese kingdom until it was sacked in 965 during the Anarchy of the 12 Warlords.

== Archaeology ==
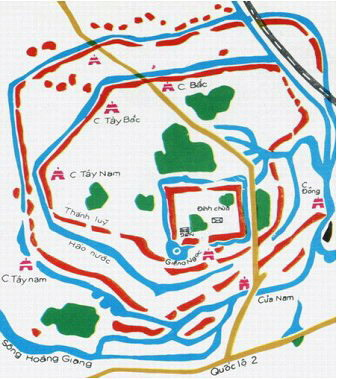
Map of Cổ Loa

The site consists of two outer sets of ramparts and a citadel on the inside, of rectangular shape. The moats consist of a series of streams, including the Hoàng Giang River and a network of lakes that provided Cổ Loa with protection and navigation.

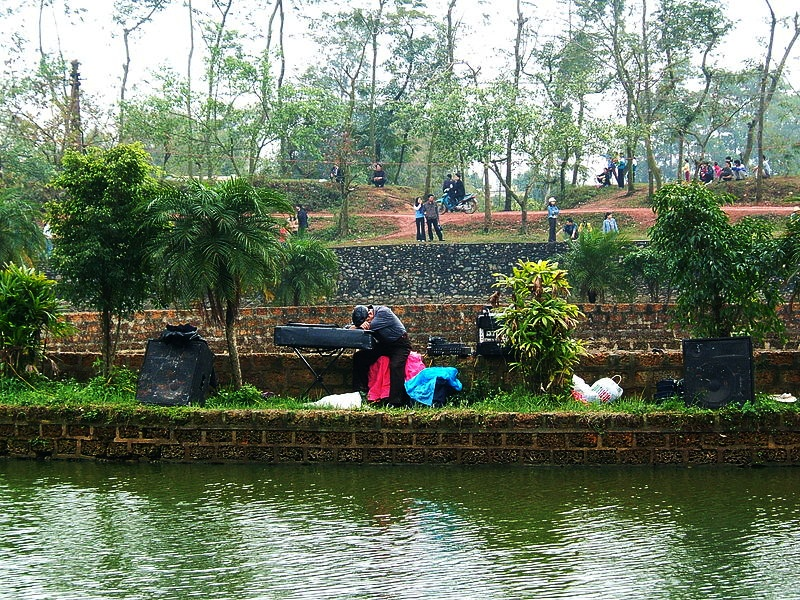
Part of the fortress walls

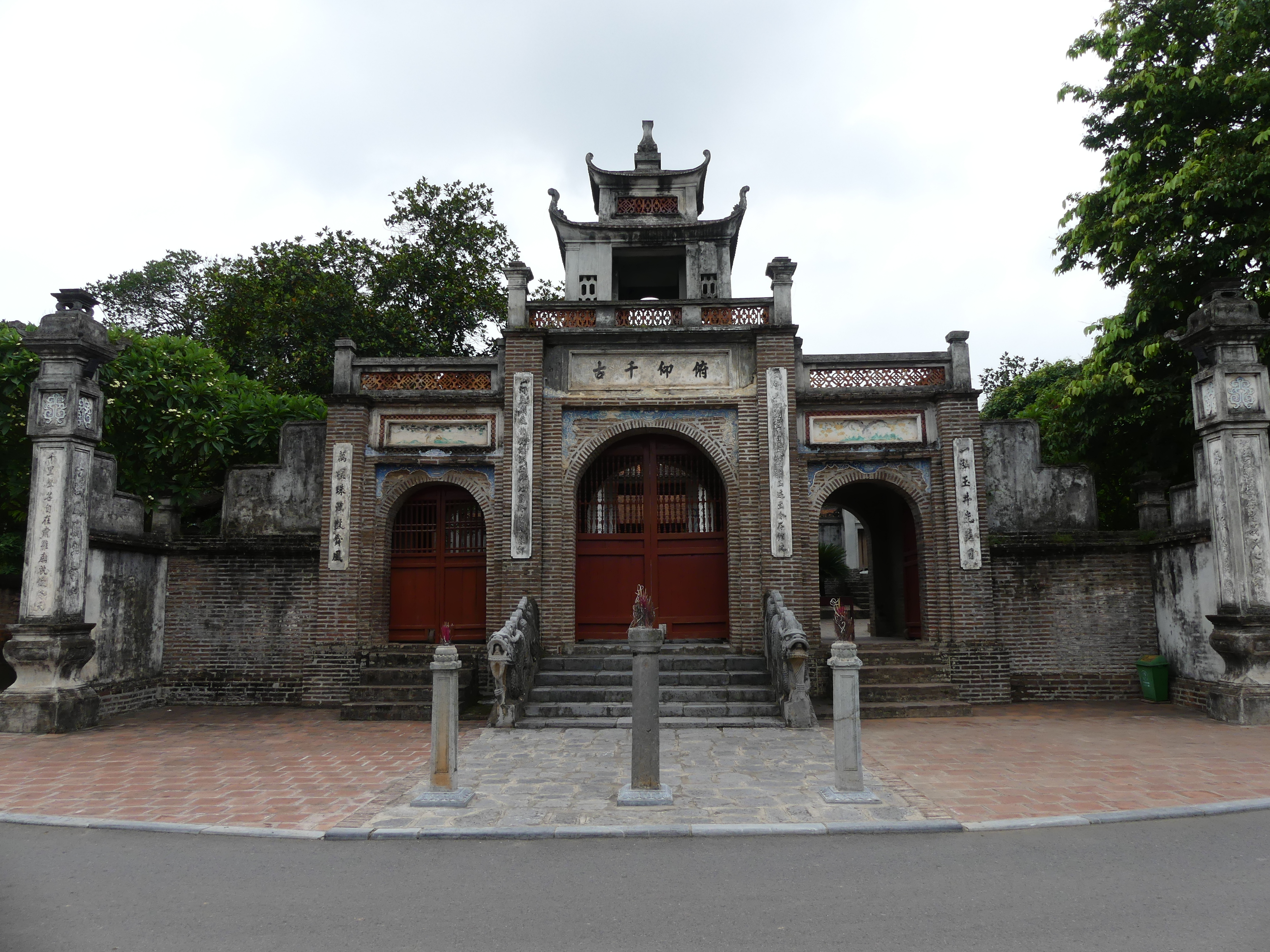
Temple of An Dương Vương at Cổ Loa

The outer rampart comprises a perimeter of 8 km and is lined with guard towers. The ramparts still stand up to 12 m high and are 25 m in width at their base. Besides, part of the inner rampart was cut through for the purpose of archaeological investigation, which was dated from 400–350 BCE. And it was suggested that this rampart was constructed by a local and indigenous society prior to the colonization of Han dynasty. The stamped earth technique or Hangtu method associated with ancient China may have been used in Cổ Loa, and studies of the defensive works are still in a preliminary stage. Archaeologists have estimated that over two million cubic metres of material were moved in order to construct the entire fortress, including moats that were fed by the Hoàng River. Kim estimated the population of Cổ Loa possibly ranged from 5,000 to around 10,000 inhabitants.

In 1970, the Vietnamese carried out an investigation at a collapsed portion of the outer wall, uncovering Dong Son culture sherds stratified beneath the wall. A 72 kg bronze drum was later excavated outside the inner wall in the 1980s. In 2004–05, cultural layers were identified within the inner wall area. Cổ Loa artefacts represented "elite-level or royal characteristics", discovered only within the site’s enclosures, supporting the notion of centralised production and monopolisation.

In 2007–2008 another excavation took place that excavated the middle wall of Cổ Loa citadel. The excavation cut through the entire width of the rampart. The stratification showed layers of construction deposits: three periods and five major phases of construction.

Excavations made by archaeologists have revealed Dong Son style pottery that had stratified over time under the walls, while a drum was found by chance by Nguyễn Giang Hải and Nguyễn Văn Hùng. The drum included a hoard of bronze objects. The rarity of such objects in Southeast Asia and the range found at Cổ Loa is believed to possibly be unique. The drum stands 57 cm high and boasting a tympanum with a diameter of 73.6 cm. The drum itself weighs 72 kg and contains around 200 pieces of bronze, including 20 kg of scrap pieces from a range of artefacts. These include socketed hoes and ploughshares, socketed axes, and spearheads.

The artifacts are numerically dominated by the ploughshares, of which there are 96. Six hoes and a chisel were in the set. There were 32 socketed axes of various shapes, including a boat shaped axehead. This was almost a replica of a clay mound found in the grave of the bronze metalworker at Làng Cả. Sixteen spearheads, a dagger and eight arrowheads were also found. One spearhead generated special interest because it was bimetallic, with an iron blade fitting into a bronze socket.

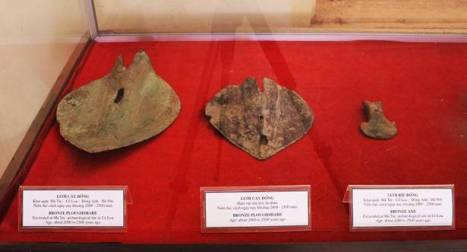
Bronze ploughshares and axe head

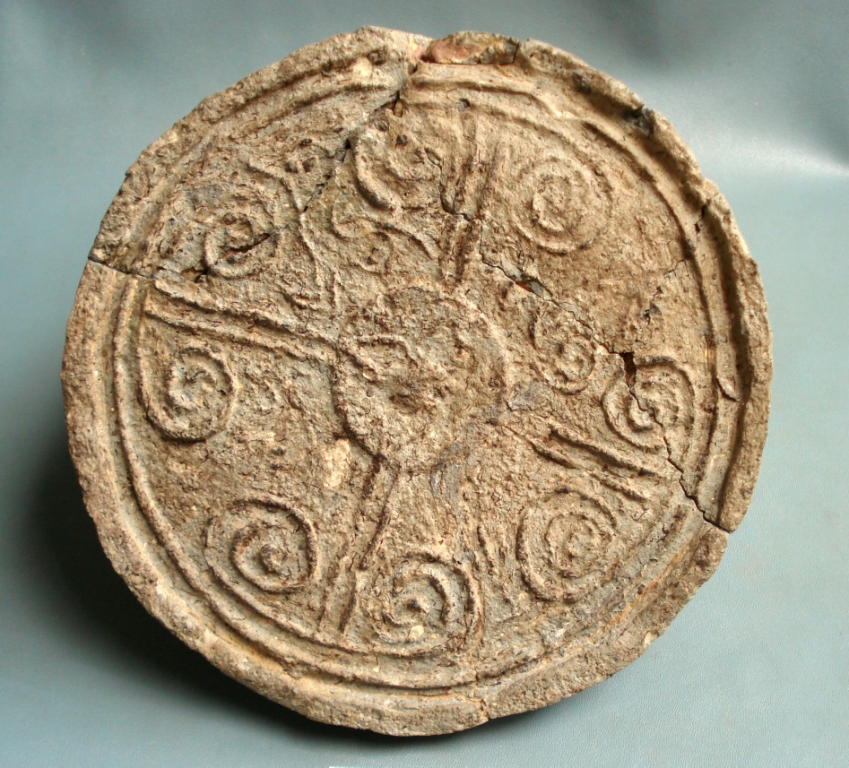
Ceramic eaves tile

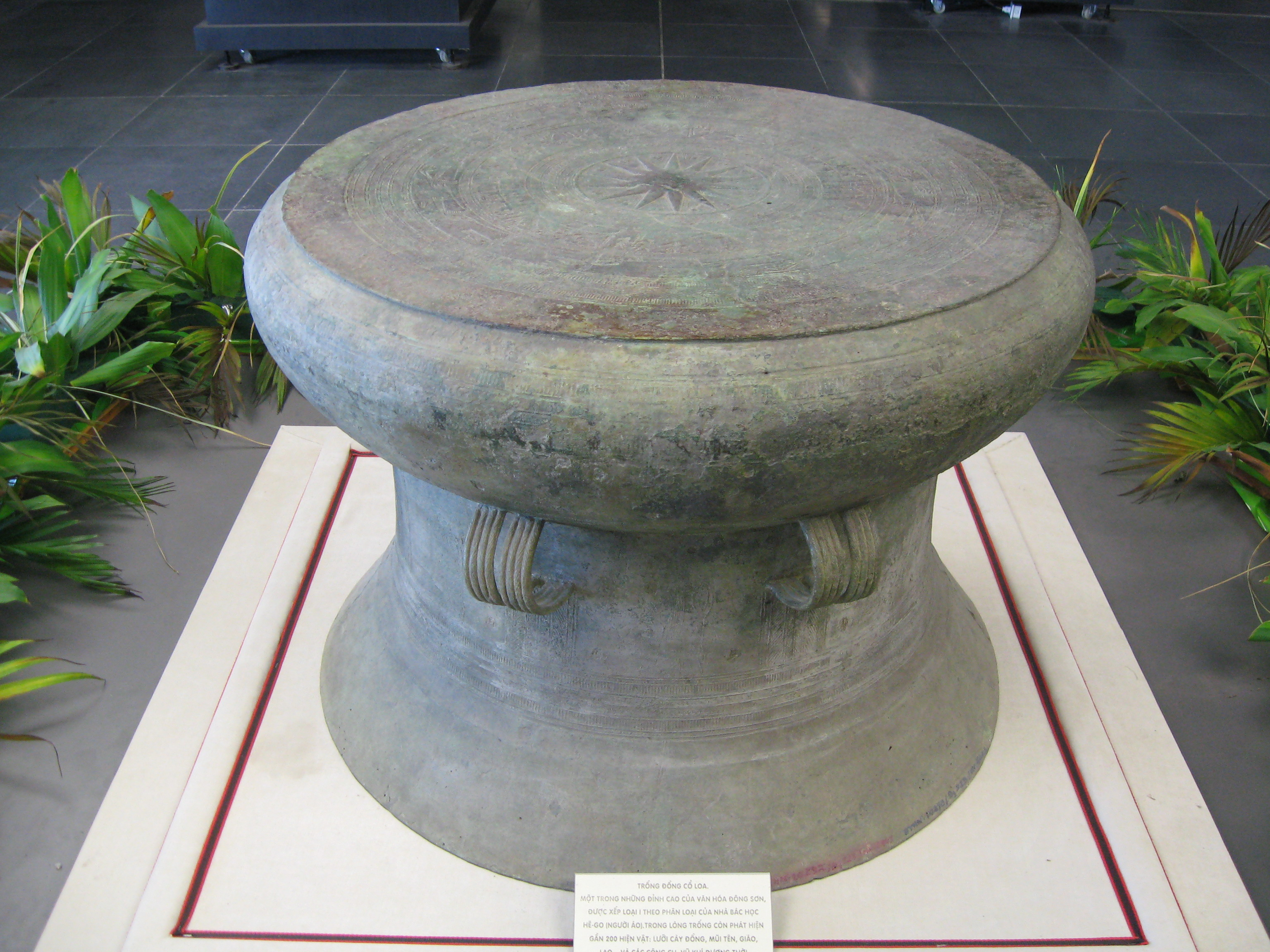
Cổ Loa bronze drum

== See also ==
- Đông Sơn culture
- List of capitals of Vietnam

== Bibliography ==
- Baldanza, Kathlene (2016). Ming China and Vietnam: Negotiating Borders in Early Modern Asia. Cambridge University Press. ISBN 978-1-316-44055-1.
- Brindley, Erica (2015). Ancient China and the Yue: Perceptions and Identities on the Southern Frontier, c. 400 BCE–50 CE. Cambridge University Press. ISBN 978-110-70847-8-0.
- Buttinger, Joseph (1958). The Smaller Dragon: A Political History of Vietnam. Praeger Publishers.
- Chapuis, Oscar (1995). A History of Vietnam: From Hong Bang to Tu Duc. Greenwood Press. ISBN 03132-9-622-7.
- Demattè, Paola (June 2015). "Travel and landscape: the Zuo River Valley rock art of Guangxi Zhuang Autonomous Region, China". Antiquity. 89 (345): 613–628. doi:10.15184/aqy.2014.49. S2CID 163701007.
- De Vos, George A.; Slote, Walter H., eds. (1998). Confucianism and the Family. State University of New York Press. ISBN 978-0-791-43735-3.
- George E. Dutton (2006). The Tay Son Uprising: Society and Rebellion in Eighteenth-Century Vietnam. University of Hawaii Press. ISBN 978-0-82482-984-1.
- Dutton, George; Werner, Jayne; Whitmore, John K., eds. (2012). Sources of Vietnamese Tradition. Introduction to Asian Civilizations. Columbia University Press. ISBN 978-0-231-13862-8.
- Đào Duy Anh (2016) [First published 1964]. Đất nước Việt Nam qua các đời: nghiên cứu địa lý học lịch sử Việt Nam (in Vietnamese). Nha Nam. ISBN 978-604-94-8700-2.
- Đào Duy Anh (2020) [First published 1958]. Lịch sử Việt Nam: Từ nguồn gốc đến cuối thế kỷ XIX (in Vietnamese). Hanoi Publishing House. ISBN 978-604-556-114-0.
- Ferlus, Michael (2009). "A Layer of Dongsonian Vocabulary in Vietnamese". Journal of the Southeast Asian Linguistics Society. 1: 95–108.
- Hoàng, Anh Tuấn (2007). Silk for Silver: Dutch-Vietnamese Rerlations; 1637–1700. Brill. ISBN 978-90-04-15601-2.
- Higham, Charles (1989). The archaeology of mainland Southeast Asia. Cambridge University Press.
- Higham, Charles (1996). The Bronze Age of Southeast Asia. Cambridge University Press. ISBN 0-521-56505-7.
- Kelley, Liam C. (2014), "Constructing Local Narratives: Spirits, Dreams, and Prophecies in the Medieval Red River Delta", in Anderson, James A.; Whitmore, John K. (eds.), China's Encounters on the South and Southwest: Reforging the Fiery Frontier Over Two Millennia, United States: Brills, pp. 78–106
- Kiernan, Ben (2019). Việt Nam: a history from earliest time to the present. Oxford University Press. ISBN 978-0-190-05379-6.
- Kim, Nam C.; Lai, Van Toi; Trinh, Hoang Hiep (2010). "Co Loa: an investigation of Vietnam's ancient capital". Antiquity. 84 (326): 1011–1027. doi:10.1017/S0003598X00067041. S2CID 162065918.
- Kim, Nam C. (2015). The Origins of Ancient Vietnam. Oxford University Press. ISBN 978-0-199-98089-5.
- Kim, Nam C. (2020), "A Pathway to Emergent Social Complexity and State Power: A View from Southeast Asia", in Bondarenko, Dmitri M.; Kowalewski, Stephen A.; Small, David B. (eds.), The Evolution of Social Institutions. World-Systems Evolution and Global Futures, Springer Publishing, pp. 225–253, doi:10.1007/978-3-030-51437-2_10, ISBN 978-3-030-51436-5, S2CID 226486108
- Leeming, David (2001). A Dictionary of Asian Mythology. Oxford University Press. ISBN 9780195120523.
- Li, Tana (2011), "A Geopolitical Overview", in Li, Tana; Anderson, James A. (eds.), The Tongking Gulf Through History, Pennsylvania: University of Pennsylvania Press, pp. 1–25
- Li, Tana (2011), "Jiaozhi (Giao Chỉ) in the Han Period Tongking Gulf", in Li, Tana; Anderson, James A. (eds.), The Tongking Gulf Through History, Pennsylvania: University of Pennsylvania Press, pp. 39–53, ISBN 978-0-812-20502-2
- Loewe, Michael (1986), "The Former Han dynasty", in Twitchett, Denis C.; Fairbank, John King (eds.), The Cambridge History of China: Volume 1, The Ch'in and Han Empires, 221 BC–AD 220, Cambridge: Cambridge University Press, pp. 110–128
- McLeod, Mark; Nguyen, Thi Dieu (2001). Culture and Customs of Vietnam. Greenwood (published June 30, 2001). ISBN 978-0-313-36113-5.
- Miksic, John Norman; Yian, Go Geok (2016). Ancient Southeast Asia. Taylor & Francis. ISBN 978-1-317-27903-7.
- Milburn, Olivia (2010). The Glory of Yue: An Annotated Translation of the Yuejue shu. Sinica Leidensia. Vol. 93. Brill Publishers. ISBN 978-90474-4-399-5.
- O’Harrow, Stephen (1979). "From Co-loa to the Trung Sisters' Revolt: Viet-Nam as the Chinese Found It". Asian Perspectives. 22 (2): 140–164. JSTOR 42928006.
- Jamieson, Neil L (1995). Understanding Vietnam. University of California Press. ISBN 9780520201576.
- SarDesai, D. R. (2005). Vietnam, Past and Present. Avalon Publishing. ISBN 978-0-813-34308-2.
- Schafer, Edward Hetzel (1967), The Vermilion Bird: T'ang Images of the South, Los Angeles: University of California Press
- Taylor, Keith Weller (1983). The Birth of the Vietnam. University of California Press. ISBN 978-0-520-07417-0.
- Taylor, Keith Weller (2013). A History of the Vietnamese. Cambridge University Press. ISBN 978-0-521-87586-8.
- Terry F. Kleeman (1998). Ta Chʻeng, Great Perfection – Religion and Ethnicity in a Chinese Millennial Kingdom. University of Hawaii Press. ISBN 0-8248-1800-8.
- Watson, Burton (1961). Records Of The Grand Historian Of China. Columbia University Press.
- Wu, Chunming; Rolett, Barry Vladimir (2019). Prehistoric Maritime Cultures and Seafaring in East Asia. Springer Singapore. ISBN 978-9813292567.
- Yu, Ying-shih (1986), "Han foreign relations", in Twitchett, Denis C.; Fairbank, John King (eds.), The Cambridge History of China: Volume 1, The Ch'in and Han Empires, 221 BC–AD 220, Cambridge: Cambridge University Press, pp. 377–463
