= Đại Việt sử ký toàn thư =

Official historical text of the Vietnamese Lê dynasty

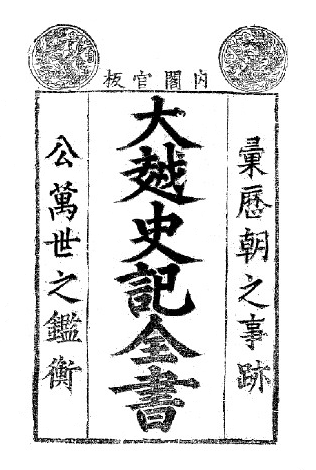
- Cover of the "Nội các quan bản" version (1697)
- Author: Ngô Sĩ Liên (original edition)
- Original title: 大越史記全書
- Language: Văn ngôn
- Subject: History of Vietnam
- Genre: Historiography
- Publisher: Lê dynasty
- Publication date: 1479 (original edition)
- Publication place: Đại Việt
- Preceded by: Đại Việt sử ký
- Followed by: Khâm định Việt sử Thông giám cương mục
- Original text: 大越史記全書 at Chinese Wikisource

The Đại Việt sử ký toàn thư (chữ Hán: 大越史記全書; Vietnamese: [ɗâːjˀ vìət ʂɨ᷉ kǐ twâːn tʰɨ]; Complete Annals of Đại Việt) is the official national chronicle of the Đại Việt, that was originally compiled by the royal historian Ngô Sĩ Liên under the order of the Emperor Lê Thánh Tông and was finished in 1479 during the Lê period. The 15-volume book covered the period from Hồng Bàng dynasty to the coronation of Lê Thái Tổ, the first emperor of the Lê dynasty in 1428. In compiling his work, Ngô Sĩ Liên based on two principal historical sources which were Đại Việt sử ký by Lê Văn Hưu and Đại Việt sử ký tục biên by Phan Phu Tiên. After its publication, Đại Việt sử ký toàn thư was continually supplemented by other historians of the royal court such as Vũ Quỳnh and Phạm Công Trứ. Today the most popular version of Đại Việt sử ký toàn thư is the Nội các quan bản edition which was completed in 1697 with the additional information up to 1656 during the reign of the Emperor Lê Thần Tông and the Lord Trịnh Tráng. Đại Việt sử ký toàn thư is considered the most important and comprehensive historical book. The chronicle provides a chronological history beginning with the legendary Hồng Bàng dynasty (2888 BCE?) and continuing to the founding of the house of Lê in 1428.

== History of compilation ==
During the Fourth Chinese domination, many valuable books of Đại Việt were taken away by the Ming dynasty including Lê Văn Hưu's Đại Việt sử ký (大越史記, Annals of Đại Việt), the official history of the Trần dynasty and the most comprehensive source of the history of Vietnam up to that era. However, the contents of the Đại Việt sử ký and Lê Văn Hưu's comments about various historical events was fully collected by the historian Phan Phu Tiên in writing the first official annals of the Lê dynasty after the order of the Emperor Lê Nhân Tông in 1455. The new Đại Việt sử ký of Phan Phu Tiên was supplemented the period from 1223 with the coronation of Trần Thái Tông to 1427 with the retreat of the Ming dynasty after the victory of Lê Lợi. Phan Phu Tiên's ten-volume work had other names such as Đại Việt sử ký tục biên (大越史記續編序, Supplementary Edition of the Annals of Đại Việt) or Quốc sử biên lục.

Đại Việt sử ký toàn thư

Vietnamese name
- Vietnamese: Đại Việt sử ký toàn thư
- Hán-Nôm: 大越史記全書

During the reign of Lê Thánh Tông, who was an emperor famous for his interest in learning and knowledge, the scholar and historian Ngô Sĩ Liên was appointed to the Bureau of History in 1473. Under the order of Thánh Tông, he based on the works of Lê Văn Hưu and Phan Phu Tiên to write the Đại Việt sử ký toàn thư which was compiled in 15 volumes (quyển) and finished in 1479. In compiling the Đại Việt sử ký toàn thư, Ngô Sĩ Liên also drew elements from other books such as Việt điện u linh tập (Compilation of the potent spirits in the Realm of Việt) or Lĩnh Nam chích quái (Extraordinary stories of Lĩnh Nam) which were collections of folk legend and myth but still considered by Ngô Sĩ Liên good sources for history because of their reliable system of citation. This was the first time such sources were used in historiography by a Vietnamese historian. Đại Việt sử ký toàn thư was finally completed in 1479 with the accounts that stopped by the coronation of Lê Thái Tổ in 1428. According to Lê Quý Đôn, Ngô Sĩ Liên also compiled an historical text about the reigns of Thái Tổ, Thái Tông and Nhân Tông named Tam triều bản ký (Records of the Three Reigns).

In 1511, the royal historian Vũ Quỳnh reorganized Ngô Sĩ Liên's work in his Việt giám thông khảo by adding the account about Thánh Tông, Hiển Tông, Túc Tông and Uy Mục, which was called Tứ triều bản ký (Records of the Four Reigns). Other historians continued to revise Đại Việt sử ký toàn thư and also add the supplemental information about the reign of the Lê dynasty, notably the 23-volume Đại Việt sử ký toàn thư tục biên (Continued Compilation of the Complete Annals of Đại Việt) was published under the supervision of Phạm Công Trứ in 1665 while the "Nội các quan bản" edition, the most comprehensive and popular version of Đại Việt sử ký toàn thư, was printed in 1697 during the Chính Hòa era by efforts of the historian Lê Hi.

== Edition ==
The original 15-volume version of Đại Việt sử ký toàn thư or the Hồng Đức edition (1479), that was named after the era name of Lê Thánh Tông, only existed in form of handwritten manuscript and hence is only partially preserved to this day. The Đại Việt sử ký tục biên or the Cảnh Trị edition (1665), that was the era name of Lê Huyền Tông has a better status of conservation but the most popular and fully preserved version of Đại Việt sử ký toàn thư until now is the Chính Hòa edition (1697) which was the only woodblock printed version of this work. Therefore, the Chính Hòa version is considered the most important historical text about the history of Vietnam from its beginning to the period of the Lê dynasty and has been often reduced, revised and corrected by later historians for contemporary needs. Today, a complete set of the "Nội các quan bản" edition is kept in the archives of the École française d'Extrême-Orient in Paris, France. This edition was translated into Vietnamese in 1993 by the Institute of Hán Nôm in Hanoi.

== Contents ==
The format of Đại Việt sử ký toàn thư was modeled after the famous Zizhi Tongjian (資治通鑑/Tư trị thông giám, Comprehensive Mirror to Aid in Government) of the Song scholar Sima Guang, which means historical events were redacted in chronological order like annals. Ngô Sĩ Liên separated his book and the history of Vietnam into Ngoại kỷ (Peripheral Records) and Bản kỷ (Basic Records) by the 938 victory of Ngô Quyền in the Battle of Bạch Đằng River. This chronological method of compilation is different from the official historical texts of Chinese dynasties, which had the layout divided in biographies of each historical figures, an approach which was initiated by Sima Qian in the Records of the Grand Historian. In record of each Vietnamese emperor, Ngô Sĩ Liên always started with a brief introduction of the emperor that provided an overview about the reigning ruler of the record. In listing the events, the historian sometimes noted an additional story about the historical figure who was mentioned in the event, some had extensive and detailed stories, notably Trần Quốc Tuấn or Trần Thủ Độ. Some important texts were also included in the original form by Ngô Sĩ Liên such as Hịch tướng sĩ or Bình Ngô đại cáo.

Contents of the Đại Việt sử ký toàn thư (Chính Hòa edition)
Peripheral Records (Ngoại kỷ)
Volume (Quyển)	Records (Kỷ)	Rulers	Period	Note
1	Hồng Bàng dynasty	Kinh Dương Vương, Lạc Long Quân, Hùng Vương		
1	Thục dynasty	An Dương Vương	257–208 BCE	
2	Triệu dynasty	Triệu Vũ Đế, Triệu Văn Vương, Triệu Minh Vương, Triệu Ai Vương, Triệu Thuật Dương Vương	207–111 BCE	
3	Western Han's domination		111 BCE–40	
3	Queen Trưng	Trưng Sisters	40–43	
3	Eastern Han's domination		43–186	
3	King Shi	Shi Xie	186–226	
4	Domination of the Eastern Wu, Jin, Liu Song, Southern Qi, Liang dynasties		226–540	
4	Early Lý dynasty	Lý Nam Đế	544–548	
4	Triệu Việt Vương	Triệu Việt Vương	548–571	
4	Later Lý dynasty	Hậu Lý Nam Đế	571–602	
5	Domination of the Sui and Tang dynasties		602–906	
5	North–South separation		906–938	
5	Ngô dynasty and 12 Lords Rebellion	Ngô Quyền, Dương Tam Kha, Ngô Xương Văn, Ngô Xương Xí	938–968	
Basic Records (Bản kỷ)
Volume (Quyển)	Records (Kỷ)	Rulers	Period	Note
1	Đinh dynasty	Đinh Tiên Hoàng, Đinh Phế Đế	968–980	
1	Early Lê dynasty	Lê Đại Hành, Lê Trung Tông, Lê Ngọa Triều	980–1009	
2	Lý dynasty	Lý Thái Tổ, Lý Thái Tông	1009–1054	
3	Lý dynasty (cont.)	Lý Thánh Tông, Lý Nhân Tông, Lý Thần Tông	1054–1138	
4	Lý dynasty (cont.)	Lý Anh Tông, Lý Cao Tông, Lý Huệ Tông, Lý Chiêu Hoàng	1138–1225	
5	Trần dynasty	Trần Thái Tông, Trần Thánh Tông, Trần Nhân Tông	1225–1293	
6	Trần dynasty (cont.)	Trần Anh Tông, Trần Minh Tông	1293–1329	
7	Trần dynasty (cont.)	Trần Hiến Tông, Trần Dụ Tông, Trần Nghệ Tông, Trần Duệ Tông	1329–1377	
8	Trần dynasty (cont.)	Trần Phế Đế, Trần Thuận Tông, Trần Thiếu Đế, Hồ Quý Ly, Hồ Hán Thương	1377–1407	
9	Later Trần dynasty	Giản Định Đế, Trùng Quang Đế	1407–1413	
9	Ming's domination		1413–1428	
10	Later Lê dynasty	Lê Thái Tổ	1428–1433	
Basic Records, recent compilation (Bản kỷ thực lục)
Volume (Quyển)	Records (Kỷ)	Rulers	Period	Note
11	Later Lê dynasty (cont.)	Lê Thái Tông, Lê Nhân Tông	1433–1459	
12	Later Lê dynasty (cont.)	Lê Thánh Tông (first record)	1459–1472	
13	Later Lê dynasty (cont.)	Lê Thánh Tông (second record)	1472–1497	
14	Later Lê dynasty (cont.)	Lê Hiến Tông, Lê Túc Tông, Lê Uy Mục	1497–1509	
15	Later Lê dynasty (cont.)	Lê Tương Dực, Lê Chiêu Tông, Lê Cung Hoàng, Mạc Đăng Dung, Mạc Đăng Doanh	1509–1533	
Basic Records, continued compilation (Bản kỷ tục biên)
Volume (Quyển)	Records (Kỷ)	Rulers	Period	Note
16	Later Lê dynasty (cont.)	Lê Trang Tông, Lê Trung Tông, Lê Anh Tông	1533–1573	
16	Mạc clan (supplement)	Mạc Đăng Doanh, Mạc Phúc Hải, Mạc Phúc Nguyên, Mạc Mậu Hợp	1533–1573	
17	Later Lê dynasty (cont.)	Lê Thế Tông	1573–1599	
17	Mạc clan (supplement)	Mạc Mậu Hợp	1573–1599	
18	Later Lê dynasty (cont.)	Lê Kính Tông, Lê Chân Tông, Lê Thần Tông	1599–1662	
19	Later Lê dynasty (cont.)	Lê Huyền Tông, Lê Gia Tông	1662–1675	

== Historical perspectives ==
=== Comparison with Lê Văn Hưu ===
While Lê Văn Hưu set the starting point for the history of Vietnam by the foundation of the Kingdom of Nam Việt, Ngô Sĩ Liên took a further step by identifying the mythical and historical figures Kinh Dương Vương and his son Lạc Long Quân as the progenitor of the Vietnamese people. Because of the lack of historical resources about Kinh Dương Vương and Lạc Long Quân, some suggests that Ngô Sĩ Liên's explanation of the Vietnamese people's origin was a measure to extend the longevity of the Vietnamese civilization rather than a literal point of departure. From the very beginning of his work, Ngô Sĩ Liên had another difference to Trần scholars in regard to the Hồng Bàng dynasty, that was while the Trần dynasty scholars only mentioned the Hồng Bàng dynasty as a symbol of excellence in the history of Vietnam, Ngô Sĩ Liên defined it the first Vietnamese dynasty which reigned the country from 2879 BC to 258 BC and thus predated the Xia dynasty, the first dynasty of China, for more than 600 years. However, Ngô Sĩ Liên's account for that long period was so brief that several modern historians challenged the authenticity of his chronology for the Hùng Vương, kings of the Hồng Bàng dynasty, and speculated that Ngô Sĩ Liên created this specific chronology mainly for the political purpose of the Lê dynasty.

Like Lê Văn Hưu, Ngô Sĩ Liên treated the Kingdom of Nam Việt as a Vietnamese entity, an opinion which was challenged by several Vietnamese historians from Ngô Thì Sĩ in eighteenth century to modern historians because the kings of Nam Việt were of Chinese origin.

In their comments on the defeat of Lý Nam Đế by Chen Baxian which led to the Third Chinese domination in Vietnam, Lê Văn Hưu criticized Lý Nam Đế for his lack of ability while Ngô Sĩ Liên remarked that the Will of Heaven was not yet favour with the Vietnamese independence.

=== Other arguments ===
Different than Lê Văn Hưu who saved his prior concern for the identity of the country from China, Ngô Sĩ Liên, according to O.W. Wolters, Ngô Sĩ Liên took the Chinese historiography as the standard in assessing historical events of the history of Vietnam. In commenting one event, the historian often cited a passage from Confucianist classics or other Chinese writings such as the Book of Song in order to rhetorically support his own statements.

From his Confucianist point of view, Ngô Sĩ Liên often made negative comments on historical figures who acted against the rule of Confucianism. For example, despite his obvious successful reign, the Emperor Lê Đại Hành was heavily criticized in Đại Việt sử ký toàn thư for his marriage with Dương Vân Nga who was the empress consort of his predecessor. One researcher even speculated that since Ngô Sĩ Liên had a bias against this emperor, he decided to attribute the famous poem Nam quốc sơn hà to Lý Thường Kiệt instead of Lê Đại Hành who was considered by several sources the proper author of the Nam quốc sơn hà. Other decisions of the rulers which did not follow the moral and political code of Confucianism were also criticized by Ngô Sĩ Liên such as the coronation of six empresses by Đinh Tiên Hoàng, the marriage of Lê Long Đĩnh with four empresses or Lý Thái Tổ's lack of interest in Confucianist classics study. Especially in the case of the Trần dynasty, Ngô Sĩ Liên always made unfavourable remarks on the marriages between closely related members of the Trần clan. The only short period during the reign of the Trần dynasty that Ngô Sĩ Liên praised was from the death of Trần Thái Tông in 1277 to the death of Trần Anh Tông in 1320 while the historian denounced many actions of the Trần rulers such as the ruthless purge of Trần Thủ Độ against Lý clan or the controversial marriage between Trần Thái Tông and the Princess Thuận Thiên.

Beside its historical value, Đại Việt sử ký toàn thư is also considered an important work of the literature of Vietnam because Ngô Sĩ Liên often provided more information about the mentioned historical figures by the additional stories which were well written like a literary work. From various comments of Ngô Sĩ Liên, it seems that the historian also tried to define and teach moral principles based on the concept of Confucianism. For example, Ngô Sĩ Liên mentioned for several times the definition of a Gentleman (Quân tử) who, according to the historian, had to possess both good qualities and righteous manners, Ngô Sĩ Liên also emphasized the importance of the Gentleman in the dynastic era by pointing out the difference between a Gentleman and a Mean man (Tiểu nhân) or determining what would be the effectiveness of the example of such Gentlemen.
