= Kinh Dương Vương =

Legendary ancient Vietnamese figure

Kinh Dương Vương 涇陽王

Leader of Xích Quỷ
- Reign: 2879 - 2792 BC
- Predecessor: Đế Minh (vi)
- Successor: Hồng Bàng Dynasty started

Hồng Bàng Thị
- Reign: 2879 - 2794 BC
- Predecessor: Founder of Hồng Bàng Thị
- Successor: Lạc Long Quân
- Born: 15 August 2919 BC; Hunan, China
- Died: 18 January 2792 BC (127 years old); Thuận Thành, Bắc Ninh Province, Xích Quỷ
- Spouse: Thần Long
- Issue: Sùng Lãm
Names
- Lộc Tục (祿續)
- Dynasty: Hồng Bàng
- Father: Đế Minh (vi)
- Mother: Vụ Tiên Nữ's daughter

Kinh Dương Vương (chữ Hán: 涇陽王; "King of Kinh Dương") is a legendary king of the ancient Vietnamese, mentioned in the 15th-century work Đại Việt sử ký toàn thư by having unified all the tribes within his territory into one state, and as the founder of the Hồng Bàng dynasty. He is considered the first sovereign of the Vietnamese people.

According to the 15th-century Đại Việt sử ký toàn thư, he ruled over the state of Xích Quỷ (赤鬼國) starting in 2879 BC. Kinh Dương Vương's father was Đế Minh (帝明, "Emperor Ming" of Chinese and Vietnamese mythology), a descendant of Shennong (Thần Nông). Kinh Dương Vương is believed to having married Thần Long, the daughter of Động Đình Quân (洞庭君; "Lord of Dongting") and given birth to Lạc Long Quân.

Today Kinh Dương Vương features with other ancient figures such as Thánh Gióng, Âu Cơ, Sơn Tinh and Thủy Tinh are a part of the elementary school texts. A popular shrine, and presumed tomb of Kinh Dương Vương, is located in the village of An Lữ, Thuận Thành District, Bắc Ninh Province.

== Legends ==
According to Đại Việt sử ký toàn thư, a book written in a Confucian perspective, Kinh Dương Vương originates from China: Emperor Ming, the great-great-grandson of the mythological Chinese ruler Shennong, went on a tour of inspection south of the Nanling Mountains, settled down and married a certain Beautiful Immortal Lady (鶩僊女 Vụ Tiên Nữ), who then gave birth to an intelligent son named Lộc Tục (祿續).

After Emperor Ming passed the throne to his eldest son, Emperor Ly(釐) to be king of the North, and Lộc Tục was appointed to be king of the South, his title Kinh Dương Vương (涇陽王). Kinh Duong Vuong was king and ruled from about 2879 BC onwards. The territory of the country under Kinh Dương Vương was claimed to be large, reaching Dongting Lake in the north, the Husunxing country (胡猻精; SV: Hồ Tôn Tinh) (i.e. Champa) in the south, the East Sea (東海, part of the Pacific Ocean) in the east and Ba Shu (巴蜀; now in today Sichuan, China) in the west. Lĩnh Nam chích quái recorded the legend that the king vigorously expelled a murderous god named Xương Cuồng. He married the daughter of the King of Động Đình (洞庭) Lake, named Thần Long (神龍 "Divine Dragon"), who gave birth to a son named Sùng Lãm (崇纜). Sùng Lãm would later succeed Kinh Dương Vương as ruler, titled Dragon Lord of Lạc (貉龍君; SV: Lạc Long Quân).

== Worship ==
Worship of Kinh Dương Vương in Vietnam is not as popular as worship of Shennong, the deity who is Hùng Vương's ancestor and a very respected one in Vietnam's agricultural beliefs; Đàn Xã Tắc(壇社稷) was established annually by feudal dynasties to worship.

Thượng Lãng communal house in Minh Hòa commune, Hưng Hà district, Thái Bình province is the oldest relic worshiping Kinh Dương Vương; Legend has it since the Đinh dynasty.

The Kinh Dương Vương Mausoleum and Temple (locally called Lăng và Đền thờ) in Bắc Ninh have long been classified by the Vietnamese feudal dynasties as shrines to worship the emperors, each time the National Ceremony will bring to the army to worship and worship people solemnly. In 2013, Bắc Ninh province announced a plan to preserve, embellish and promote the population of national historical and cultural relics of Mausoleum and Kinh Dương Vương Temple with a total investment of more than 491 billion VND. The project is divided into 4 main construction categories, including: relic conservation space, focusing on repairing and embellishing the relics of the Mausoleum and Kinh Dương Vương Temple, temple grounds, tomb gardens; relic value space includes: ancestral monument, cultural festival square, cultural display...accompanied by ancillary services to develop spiritual cultural tourism, attracting tourists and technical infrastructure, leveling, roads, electricity lines. At present, the Kinh Duong Vuong tomb and temple relic is worshiped in Á Lữ village, Đại Đồng Thành commune, Thuận Thành district, Bắc Ninh province.

== Other theories ==
Many historical researchers suspected that Kinh Dương Vương was a legendary figure based on elements from the novella Story of Liu Yi (柳毅 SV: Liễu Nghị truyện). Historical researcher Trần Trọng Dương pointed out that:

The Kinh Dương Vương story has [signs of] being copied from the novella Story of Liu Yi (SV: Liễu Nghị truyện) by Li Chaowei (SV: Lý Triều Uy) composed in the Tang dynasty. The story can be summarized as follows: Liu Yi was a failed contestant; while on his way he met a beautiful young goatherdess with a worn-out appearance. The woman said that she was the daughter of the Dragon King in Dongting Lake (SV: Động Đình); she married the second son of [the Dragon Lord in] Jing River (SV: Kinh Xuyên), but was mistreated and was forced to herd goats; so she wanted Liu Yi to send a letter to [her] father and report her situation. Liu Yi brought the letter to the Dragon Palace. The [Dongting Lake's] Dragon King's younger brother, [the Dragon Lord in] Qiantang [river] (SV: Tiền Đường), was so angry that he killed the son of [the Dragon Lord in] Jing river, saved her, and intended to marry her to Liu Yi. Yi refused and just asked to [be allowed to] return [home]; and he was rewarded by the Dragon King with plenty of gold and silver and gems. Afterwards, Yi got married, yet every time he got married his wife would die. The daughter of the Dragon King, seeing that, recalled that their past fateful encounter. She wanted to repay him, so she turned herself into a beautiful lady and married Liu Yi as her husband. Afterwards, the couple became immortals.

This view has been expressed by many Vietnamese historians since the 18th century: for example, Ngô Thì Sĩ in Prefatory Compilation to Đại Việt's Historical Records

Now we're examining what was written in the Outer Annals: The year of Nhâm Tuất [the sexagenary cycle's 59th year]? When had been the beginning year of Giáp Tí [the same cycle's 1st year]? [The authors] recorded the taboo names of King of Kinh Dương and Dragon Lord of Lạc, why omitted [those of] Hùng kings? Before the Five Emperors' time, [rulers] had not been called kings [王; standard Chinese: wáng; SV: vương]. What kind of name was the name Xích Quỷ? Why used it as a national name? A series of blatantly preposterous things only fit to be discarded. That was the fault of someone garrulous who found that story in The Story about Liễu Nghị. In the Story [about Liễu Nghị], it was said that the daughter of the [Dragon] King in Dongting Lake had been married off to the second son of the [Dragon] King in Jing River; [the story about Liễu Nghị] was irresponsibly imagined to be [the story about] King of Kinh Dương. Now that there have been husband and wife, there shall also be father and son, king and subject. Consequently, [someone] wove it into a written prose, just so there would be enough generations of kings. The historians, accordingly, chose to use it and took it as factual. All of those were stories taken from Selection of Strange Tales in Lingnan and Collection of Stories about the Shady and Spiritual Việt Realm; just as Northern historians had taken stories from The Classic of Southern Florescence or the Chapters of Honglie.

as well as the Nguyễn dynasty's historians in The Imperially Ordered Outlined and Detailed Texts Thoroughly Mirroring of the History of Viet

茲奉查之舊史，鴻厖氏紀，涇陽王、貉龍君之稱緣上古，世屬渺茫，作者憑空撰出，恐無所取信，又附小說家唐柳毅傳以為印證。
[Among] the old histories which [we've] obediently examined just now, the records of the Hồng Bàng clan, king of Kinh Dương, Dragon Lord of Lạc (those [which were] stated to stem from the distant past, in a vague and remote age), the author(s) relied on nothing to write [those], [yet] he(they) still feared not being taken as credible; so he(they) added [elements from] [a] Tang novellist's Story of Liu Yi as proofs.

Consequently, Emperor Tự Đức of the Nguyen dynasty decided to exclude King of Kinh Duong and Dragon Lord of Lạc from their historiography as this did not conform with the Confucian ideals of the country.

Kinh Dương Vương Hồng Bàng Dynasty
Preceded by New creation	King of Xích Quỷ	Succeeded by Hùng Hiền Vương
