= Literary Chinese in Vietnam =

Classical Chinese as written in Vietnam

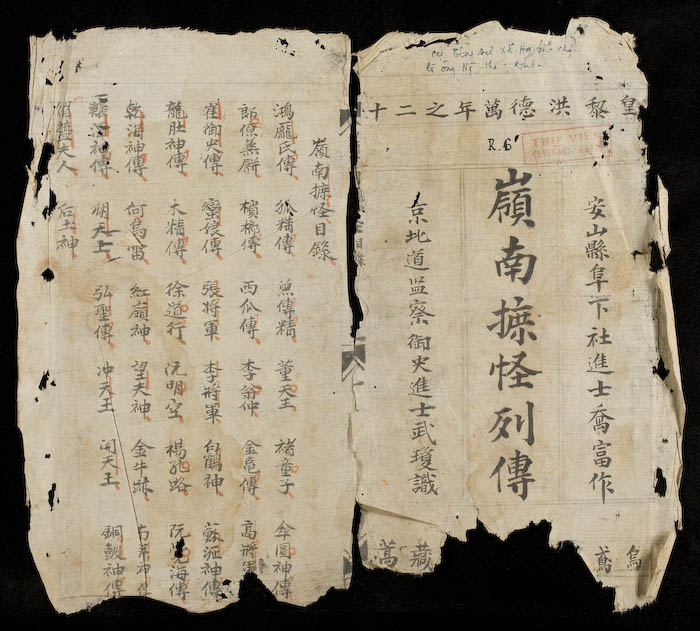
Wondrous Tales of Lĩnh Nam, a 14th-century collection of stories of Vietnamese history, written in Chinese

Literary Chinese (Vietnamese: Hán văn, văn ngôn; chữ Hán: 漢文, 文言) was the medium of all formal writing in Vietnam for almost all of the country's history until the early 20th century, when it was replaced by vernacular writing in Vietnamese using the Latin-based Vietnamese alphabet. Literary Chinese was the official language of Vietnamese governments (except the Hồ and Tây Sơn dynasties) until it was replaced by the French language in 1884.

The language used in Vietnam was the same as that used in China, as well as in Korea and Japan, and used the same standard Chinese characters. It was used for official business, historical annals, fiction, verse, scholarship, and even for declarations of Vietnamese determination to resist Chinese invaders. Literary Chinese was briefly replaced by the Vietnamese language (written in Chữ Nôm) as the official government language during the Hồ dynasty (1400–1407) and the Tây Sơn dynasty (1778–1802).

== Literary Chinese ==
Literary Chinese was a style of writing modelled on the classics of the Warring States period and Han dynasty, such as the Mencius, the Commentary of Zuo and Sima Qian's Historical Records. It remained largely static while the various varieties of Chinese evolved and diverged to the point of mutual unintelligibility. The language was also used for formal writing in Vietnam, Korea and Japan, enabling scholars from these countries, as well as China, to communicate in writing, in a role similar to that of Latin in Europe.

Literary Chinese as written in Vietnam used the same characters and outward form as in China. Although Literary Chinese was used only for written communication, each Chinese character could be read aloud in a Vietnamese approximation of the Middle Chinese pronunciation. For example, the term for Chinese characters, 漢字 (Hànzì in Modern Standard Chinese) has a Sino-Vietnamese reading of Hán tự. With these pronunciations, Chinese words were imported wholesale into the Vietnamese language. The resulting Sino-Vietnamese vocabulary makes up over half of the Vietnamese lexicon.

The Vietnamese terms for writing in Chinese are chữ Hán ('Han characters') or chữ Nho ('Scholars' characters') in contrast to chữ Nôm ('Southern script'), a script for the Vietnamese language. The Nôm script, using a mixture of Chinese characters and locally created characters, became the vehicle for a flourishing vernacular literature, peaking in the late 18th and early 19th centuries. However, Literary Chinese remained the medium of scholarship and administration for almost all of the period until the early 20th century.

== History ==
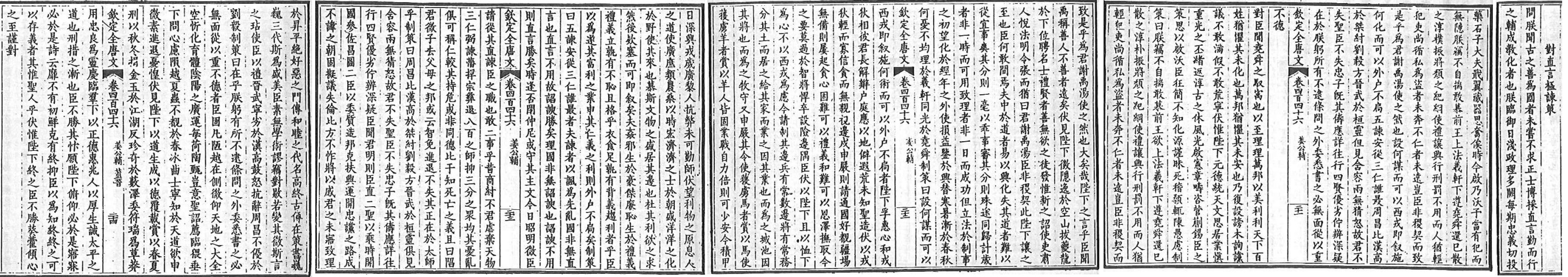
An 1814 printing of the preserved compliance note titled "Đỗi trực ngôn cực gián", written by Jiang Gongfu in 758

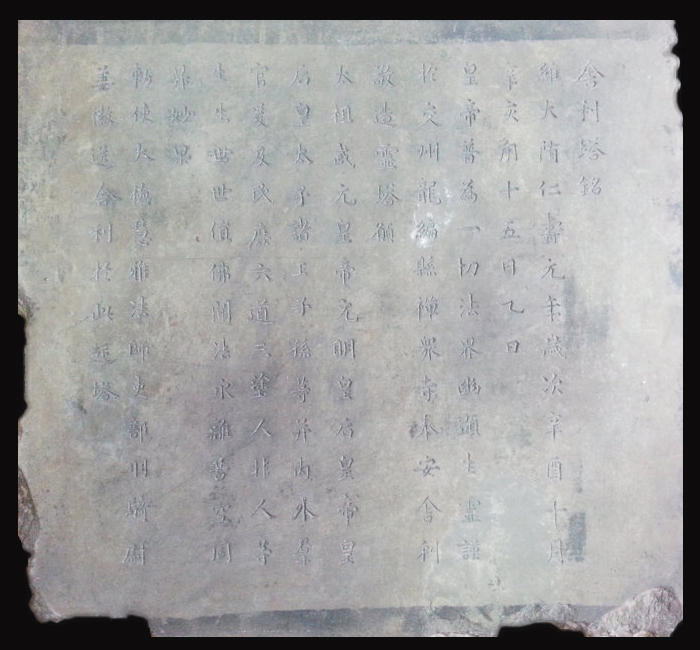
Xá Lợi Buddhist temple stele, erected in 601

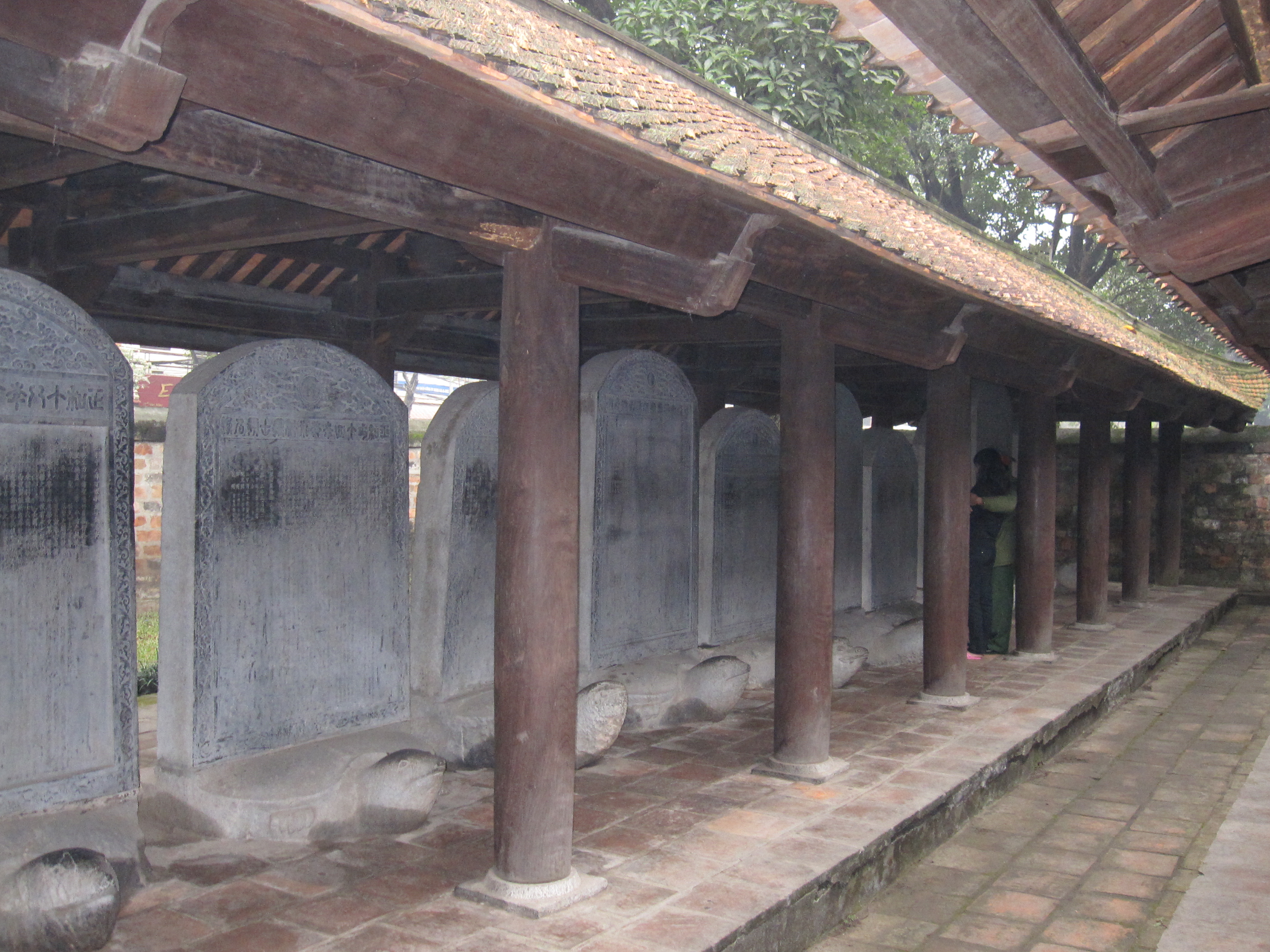
Stelae at the Temple of Literature in Hanoi, recording the names of doctoral graduates in the civil service examinations

The northern part of Vietnam (down to about the 17th parallel) was incorporated into the Han empire in 111 BC, beginning a millennium of Chinese rule, interrupted only by two short-lived revolts. At first, the empire sought to rule their new possession indirectly through the Vietnamese nobility, but after an influx of refugees fleeing the takeover of Wang Mang (9–23 AD), policy shifted to assimilation, contributing to the revolt of the Trưng sisters (39–43). After the suppression of the revolt, Chinese authorities stepped up assimilation, destroying the estates of Vietnamese nobles, but also opening Chinese education to the Vietnamese. A few rose through the civil service to senior positions in the province and elsewhere in the empire. As in any other part of the empire, the administrative language of Vietnam was Chinese.

After the country achieved independence in 938, it continued to use Literary Chinese. At first, Buddhist monks dominated government and scholarship in the country. The next extant writings by Vietnamese authors are poems from the late 10th century, in Chinese, by the Buddhist monks Lạc Thuận and Khuông Việt.

After three short-lived dynasties, the Lý dynasty (1009–1225) was established with the support of Buddhist clergy. When the first king moved the capital to Hanoi in the following year, he issued the 110-character Edict on the Transfer of the Capital. Confucian influence grew over the course of the dynasty, with a Confucian Temple of Literature being erected in the capital in 1070. Civil service examinations on the Chinese model began in 1075, and in the following year, a college was established for training sons of the ruling elite in the Confucian classics.

When the Chinese Song empire invaded the country in 1076, the general Lý Thường Kiệt wrote a 4-line poem titled Mountains and rivers of the Southern country. His poem was the first of a series of statements expressing Vietnamese determination to resist northern invaders, all written in Literary Chinese. Later examples include:

- a Call to the Officers of the Army, issued in 1285 when the country was facing a Mongol invasion,
- Return to the Capital, a poem celebrating the expulsion of the Mongols in 1288, and
- the Great Proclamation upon the Pacification of the Wu, celebrating the end of the Ming occupation in 1428.

The influence of Confucian literati grew in the following Trần dynasty (1225–1400) until they had a monopoly on public office. The first official history, the Annals of Đại Việt (1272), was commissioned during this dynasty. Although this work has been lost, it served as a model for later annals, and parts of it are preserved in later annals that were written in Chinese, which include the Abbreviated Annals of Đại Việt (late 14th century) and the Complete Annals of Đại Việt (1479). Unofficial histories from this period include the Spirits of the Departed in the Viet Realm and the Wondrous Tales of Lĩnh Nam, parts of which were also incorporated into the Complete Annals.

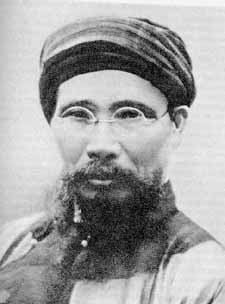
The Vietnamese nationalist Phan Bội Châu (1867–1940), wrote in Literary Chinese.

Literary Chinese remained the language of administration throughout the traditional period, except during two short-lived reformist regimes. When Hồ Quý Ly seized the throne in 1400, as well as pursuing a programme of land reform, he sought to break the power of the Confucian literati by making Vietnamese, written in the Nôm script, the state language, and translating the classics to make them available to all. Hồ's reforms were reversed after Ming China invaded the country. None of the Nôm literature of the period has survived, through a combination of the Ming destruction of Vietnamese libraries, and the continued prestige of Chinese works after the Ming were driven out. Similar reforms were attempted by Nguyễn Huệ from 1788, but were again reversed at the beginning of the succeeding Nguyễn dynasty (1802–1945).

The shared written language made it possible for Vietnamese scholars to communicate with literate Chinese and Koreans, but only in writing. They required interpreters for verbal communication. The Vietnamese sent their best scholars as envoys to the Chinese capital, where they were to purchase the latest Chinese books, and enter poetry-writing competitions with Chinese and Korean scholars. The 18th-century triumph of Lê Quý Đôn in such a competition became a focus of national pride. Lê Quý Đôn is considered the last great author of Chinese literature in Vietnam. His prodigious output included a history of Vietnam, collected essays on a wide variety of topics, anthologies of verse, and commentaries on the classics.

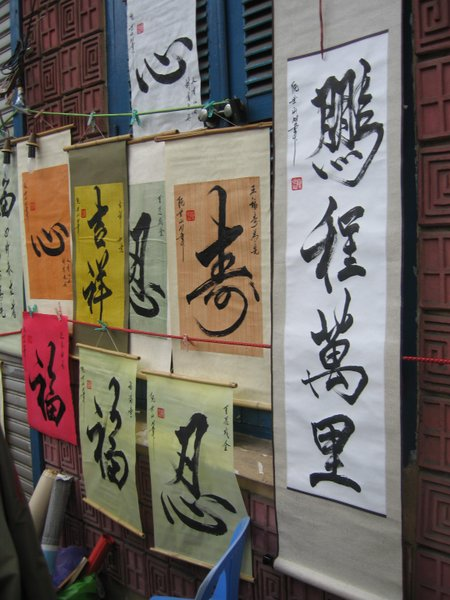
Chinese characters used for decorative purposes in modern Vietnam

Vietnamese intellectuals continued to write in Chinese until the early decades of the 20th century. For example, the nationalist Phan Bội Châu (1867–1940) wrote his History of the Loss of Vietnam (1905) and other tracts in Literary Chinese, and also used it to communicate when in Japan and China, as he spoke neither Japanese nor Chinese. Writers such as Phan Bội Châu, Phan Châu Trinh, and the principal of the Tonkin Free School even used Chinese to write their attacks on education in Chinese and the examination system. On the other side, the French colonial authorities were also opposed to Chinese, both because it made administration more difficult for them, and because of the nationalist literature being circulated in the language. The French abolished the examination system in 1913, and both Literary Chinese and chữ Nôm were swiftly replaced by the Latin-based Vietnamese alphabet in the early 20th century. In modern Vietnam, Chinese characters are seen only singly or in stock phrases written by calligraphers.

== See also ==
- Giải âm
- Adoption of Chinese literary culture
