= Dương Vân Nga =

Dương Thị Ngọc Vân 楊氏玉雲
- Empress Đại Thắng Minh
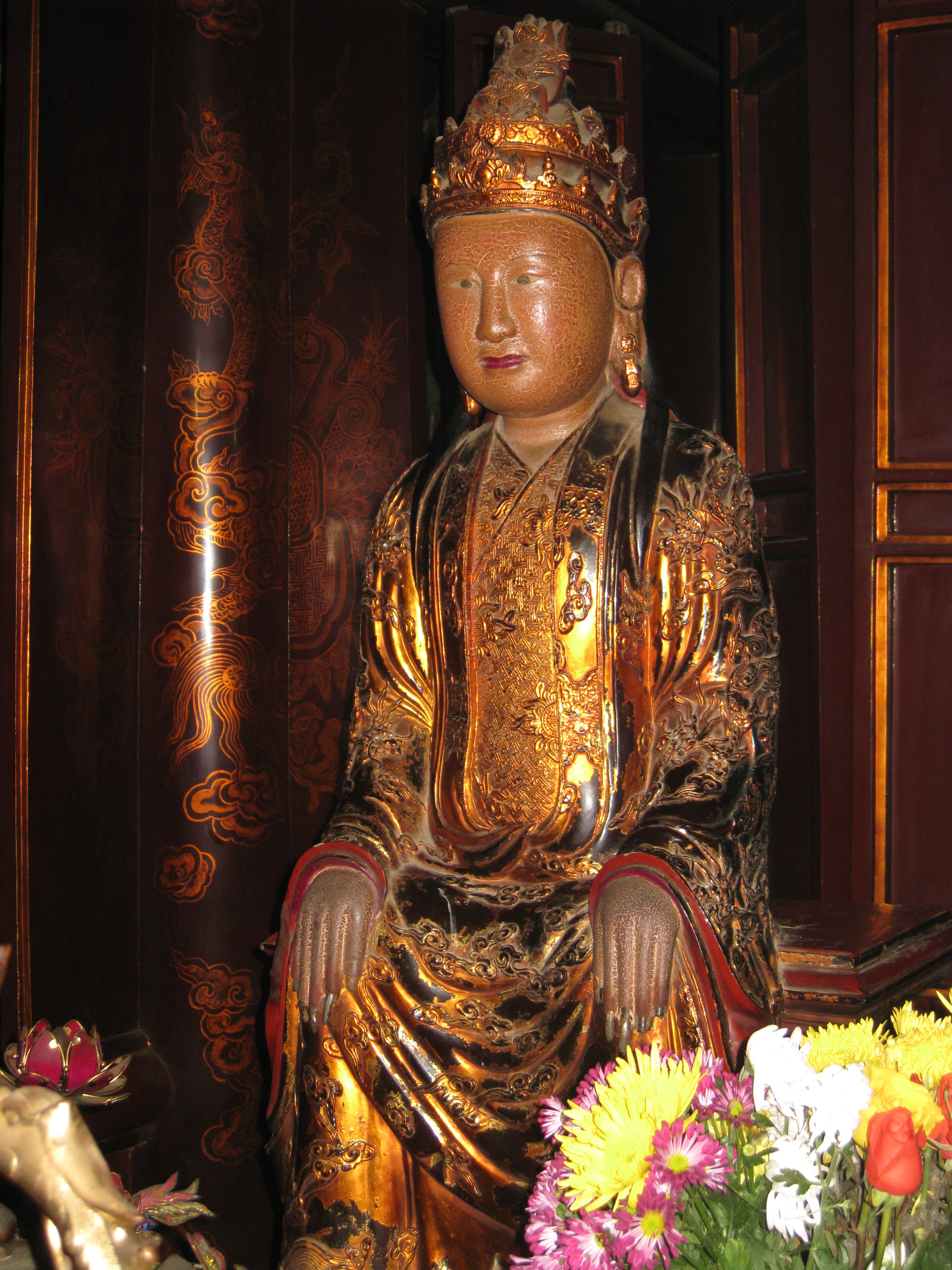
- Statue of Dương Vân Nga in the Temple of Lê Đại Hành

Empress Dowager of the Đinh dynasty
- Tenure: 979–980
- Predecessor: none
- Successor: none

Empress of Early Lê dynasty
- Tenure: 981–1000
- Predecessor: none
- Born: 952; Annam
- Died: 1000 (age 47 - 48); Hoa Lư, Annam
- Spouse: Đinh Tiên Hoàng (?–979); Lê Đại Hành (980–1000)
- Issue: Đinh Phế Đế (with Đinh Tiên Hoàng); Lê Thị Phất Ngân (with Lê Đại Hành)
Names
- Dương Vân Nga
- House: Đinh dynasty Early Lê dynasty
- Father: Dương Thế Hiển or Dương Tam Kha

Dương Thị Ngọc Vân (楊氏玉雲, 952 – 1000), courtesy name Vân Nga (雲娥), was the only empress dowager of the Đinh dynasty and afterwards empress of Lê Đại Hành, the first emperor of the Early Lê dynasty. When her husband Đinh Tiên Hoàng was assassinated in 979, Dương Vân Nga became the Empress Dowager of the Đinh dynasty as her son Đinh Phế Đế succeeded the throne. During the short-lived reign of Đinh Phế Đế, Dương Vân Nga and the general Lê Hoàn jointly held the regentship for the 6-year-old emperor, later it was Dương Vân Nga and general Phạm Cự Lượng who decided to cede the Đinh dynasty's throne for Lê Hoàn in 980 so that Đại Cồ Việt could stand the Song dynasty's invasion with a capable ruler. Subsequently, Lê Hoàn entitled Dương Vân Nga as his empress, hence she became the first woman in the history of Vietnam to be married to two emperors.

== Biography ==
=== Đinh dynasty ===
According to some sources, Dương Vân Nga was the daughter of a subordinate of the warlord Dương Đình Nghệ and came from the Ái province (now Thanh Hóa, Vietnam), others claim that Dương Vân Nga was from the same town Hoa Lư as Đinh Tiên Hoàng.

Being one of Đinh Tiên Hoàng's wives, Dương Vân Nga gave birth to his youngest son Đinh Toàn in 974. At the end of 979, as Đinh Tiên Hoàng and his eldest prince Đinh Liễn were assassinated by Đỗ Thích, the 6-year-old prince Đinh Toàn was made the successor of the throne of the Đinh dynasty while his mother Dương Vân Nga became the Empress Dowager of the Đinh dynasty and took charge of the regentship with the general Lê Hoàn who was promoted to the position of viceroy of the Đinh dynasty.

=== Regency ===
The short-lived reign of Đinh Toàn, now Đinh Phế Đế was perturbed by the revolt of Đinh Điền and Nguyễn Bặc who had been important officials in the royal court of Đinh Tiên Hoàng while the country also had to face with the intrusion led by Ngô Nhật Khánh, son-in-law of Đinh Tiên Hoàng, with reinforcements from the kingdom of Champa in the southern border. The rebellion of Đinh Điền and Nguyễn Bặc was quickly put down by Lê Hoàn but in the north, the Song dynasty began an invasion of Đại Cồ Việt in profiting its chaotic situation after the death of Đinh Tiên Hoàng, finally Dương Vân Nga and the general Phạm Cự Lượng with the agreement from the majority of officials in royal court, decided to elevate Lê Hoàn for the throne so that the country had an able ruler who could deal with grave troubles at that time, hence the Early Lê dynasty was established and replaced the Đinh dynasty.

The account of Đinh Phế Đế's abdication for Lê Hoàn is slightly different in each historical record, for example in Đại Việt sử lược, which is the oldest chronicles of history of Vietnam that remains, and Đại Việt sử ký toàn thư, it was Phạm Cự Lượng who proposed the Empress Dowager to cede her son's throne to Lê Hoàn, On the other hand, in Khâm định Việt sử thông giám cương mục, since Dương Vân Nga appeared to have affection for Lê Hoàn during their regency, Nguyễn Bặc and Đinh Điền decided to rise a revolt with the main purpose of overthrowing Lê Hoàn and protecting the child emperor, subsequently it was the Empress Dowager who had the principal role in the enthronement of Lê Hoàn when she entrusted the defence against the Song dynasty's invasion for Lê Hoàn and herself persuaded him to accept the proposition of Phạm Cự Lượng. Trần Trọng Kim in his Việt Nam sử lược also agreed with Khâm định Việt sử thông giám cương mục about the affair between Dương Vân Nga and Lê Hoàn during their regentship.

=== Early Lê dynasty ===
After his coronation, Lê Hoàn succeeded in driving out the invasion of the Song dynasty in 981, afterwards he entitled the former empress dowager Dương Vân Nga as the new empress of the Early Lê dynasty with the name Empress Đại Thắng Minh (Vietnamese: Đại Thắng Minh Hoàng hậu). With this second marriage, Dương Vân Nga became the first woman in the history of Vietnam to be married to two emperors. The marriage between Lê Hoàn and Dương Vân Nga was severely criticized by the Confucian historian Ngô Sĩ Liên who remarked that the fornication between the general and his emperor's wife and later their marriage seriously violated the Confucian moral codes and so became the seeds for the immorality of his son afterwards. Another dynastic historian, Ngô Thì Sĩ, even despised the new title Empress Đại Thắng Minh (literally Bright Empress of Great Victory) of Dương Vân Nga which was identical with the title of her first husband Emperor Đại Thắng Minh (Đại Thắng Minh Hoàng đế) Đinh Tiên Hoàng, in Ngô Thì Sĩ's opinion, this naming was a "forever derision" ("để cười nghìn thu") in the history of Vietnam.

Dương Vân Nga died in 1000 or the seventh year of the Ứng Thiên era of Lê Đại Hành. She died in the same year as Lê Thâu, the eldest son of Lê Hoàn.

== Legacy ==
Today Dương Vân Nga, together with Lê Đại Hành and his sons Lê Long Đĩnh and Lê Long Việt, is still worshipped in the Temple of Lê Đại Hành in Hoa Lư which is located next to the tomb of Đinh Tiên Hoàng, her first husband. Since she witnessed a turbulent time and herself participated in various important events in history of Vietnam, the life of Dương Vân Nga becomes subject of several chèo, cải lương plays and a novel named Hoàng hậu hai triều Dương Vân Nga (Dương Vân Nga, Empress of Two Dynasties). She was famously portrayed by Bạch Tuyết. Dương Vân Nga and Lê Đại Hành's only known daughter, Princess Lê Thị Phất Ngân married Lý Công Uẩn, who became Emperor Lý Thái Tổ. Their son was Emperor Lý Thái Tông.

Dương Vân Nga House of Đinh Died: 1000
Regnal titles
Preceded by none	Empress Dowager of the Đinh dynasty 979–980	Succeeded by none
Preceded by none	Empress of the Early Lê dynasty 981–1000	Succeeded by
