= Lạc Long Quân =

Ancient king of Vietnam

Lạc Long Quân 貉龍君
- Lạc Long Quân
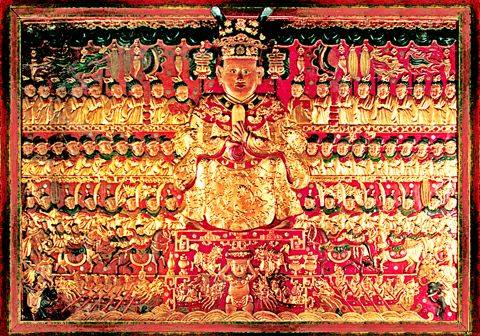
- Lạc Long Quân the patriarch, wood carving at Nội Bình Đà Temple of Bình Đà village, Hanoi.

Hồng Bàng dynasty
- Reign: 2793 - 2524 BC (269 years)
- Predecessor: Kinh Dương Vương
- Successor: Cấn line
- Born: 2825 BC; Xích Quỷ
- Died: 2524 BC (301 years); Xích Quỷ
- Spouse: Âu Cơ
- Issue: 100 sons and daughters
Names
- Sùng Lãm (崇纜)
- Dynasty: Hồng Bàng
- Father: Kinh Dương Vương
- Mother: Thần Long

Lạc Long Quân (Chữ Hán: 貉龍君; "Dragon King of Lạc"), also known as Sùng Lãm (崇纜), is a legendary king of the Hồng Bàng dynasty of ancient Vietnam. Quân was the son of Kinh Dương Vương, the king of Xích Quỷ. He is the main figure in the Vietnamese myth of Lạc Long Quân - Âu Cơ.

According to the myth, Lạc Long Quân married Âu Cơ, a mountain goddess. She gives birth to a sac containing 100 eggs from which 100 children were born; this is the origin of the Vietnamese people. One day Lạc Long Quân told Âu Cơ: "I am descended from dragons, you from immortals. We are as incompatible as water is with fire. So we cannot continue in harmony." This said, the husband and wife parted. The man went to the seawards with 50 of their children, while his wife went to the mountainous region with the other half of the clan. The eldest son, who followed his mother, later installed himself as Quân's successor.

== Genealogy ==
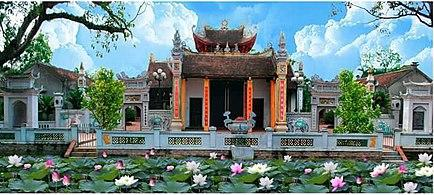
Nội Bình Đà Temple

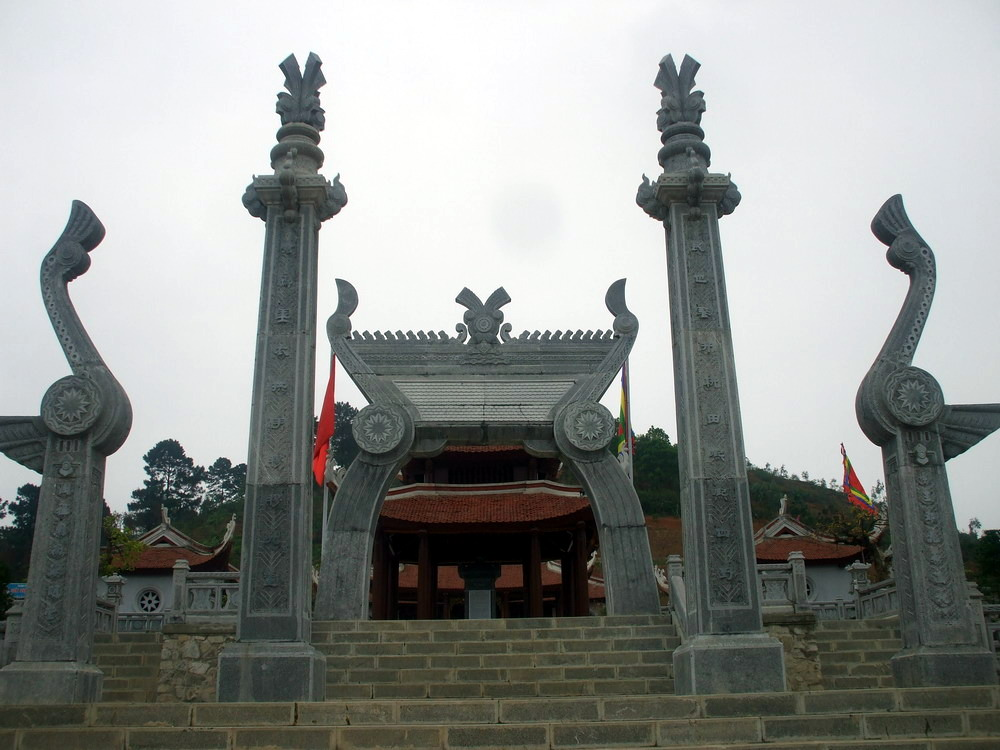
Temple of Lạc Long Quân in Phú Thọ

Lạc Long Quân's father was Kinh Dương Vương and Lạc Long Quân's mother is Thần Long.

== In Vietnamese literature ==
The books Đại Việt sử ký toàn thư (from the 15th century) and Lĩnh Nam chích quái ("Wonders plucked from the dust of Linh-nam", from the 14th century) mention the legend with Âu Cơ. Ngô Sĩ Liên commented on the somewhat primitive nature of the relationship between the two progenitors, given that Lạc's father Kinh Dương Vương and Âu's grandfather Đế Nghi were brothers. (Note: The text reads: According to the Addendum to the Tongjian, Đế Lai was Đế Nghi's son; as such, that they[, Lạc and Âu,] still married even though Kinh Dương Vương was Đế Nghi's younger brother, would it be because they didn't know the proper conduct back in those primitive times?)

== Mythology ==
=== Slaying of the Ngư tinh ===
During Lạc Long Quân's time, the people of Van Lang was still undeveloped and isolated. In the Eastern sea, there appears a giant Fish called Ngư Tinh, Vietnamese for "fish monster" or "fish spirit". This fish has lived for many centuries and had a mouth so big it could swallow an entire ship containing 10 fisherman in a single gulp. Whenever the fish swims, waves would reach for the sky, drowning many ships unfortunate enough to be caught in its path, and all the people passing through the area would become the fish's next meal. Ngư Tinh lives in a big cave under the sea, above the cave is a huge mountain which divides the sea into two areas.

Lạc Long Quân decided to offer his help to the people by slaying the fish. He built a huge ship, made a burning human-shaped piece of metal, then sailed straight towards Ngư Tinh's nest. There he held the human-shaped piece of metal up to trick Ngư Tinh. Ngư Tinh thought it was a human, so it opened its mouth and tried to swallow the burning metal. Quân then threw the burning metal into Ngư Tinh's mouth. Ngư Tinh 's throat was burning, it struggled and tried to sink Quân's ship. Quân then took his sword out and slew the beast, slicing it into three pieces.

=== Slaying of the Hồ tinh ===
After slaying Ngư Tinh, Quân went down to Long Biên. There lived a one thousand-year old nine-tailed fox called Hồ Tinh, Vietnamese for "fox monster" or "fox spirit". The fox lived in a deep cave, beneath Rock Mountain in the west of Long Biên. This fox often disguised itself as a human in order to lure the village men and women, then bring them to the cave and devour them. This fox has been harassing people from Long Biên to Tản Viên mountain for centuries and the villagers were so afraid of the fox that they have to leave their homes and farms to other places in order to live peacefully. Quân brought his sword to the beast's nest and set out to slay the beast, just as he had with Ngư Tinh before. When Quân reached the cave, the fox smelt the scent of human flesh and emerged her lair to confront whoever it was who dared trespass into her domain. Upon seeing the beast, Quân then used magic to call the elements of wind and thunder to trap Hồ Tinh and after 3 days, the beast was weakened and attempted to flee from her attacker. Quân caught the demon fox and decapitated her. Quân descended into the cave and rescued everybody that was still alive and returned them back to Long Biên.

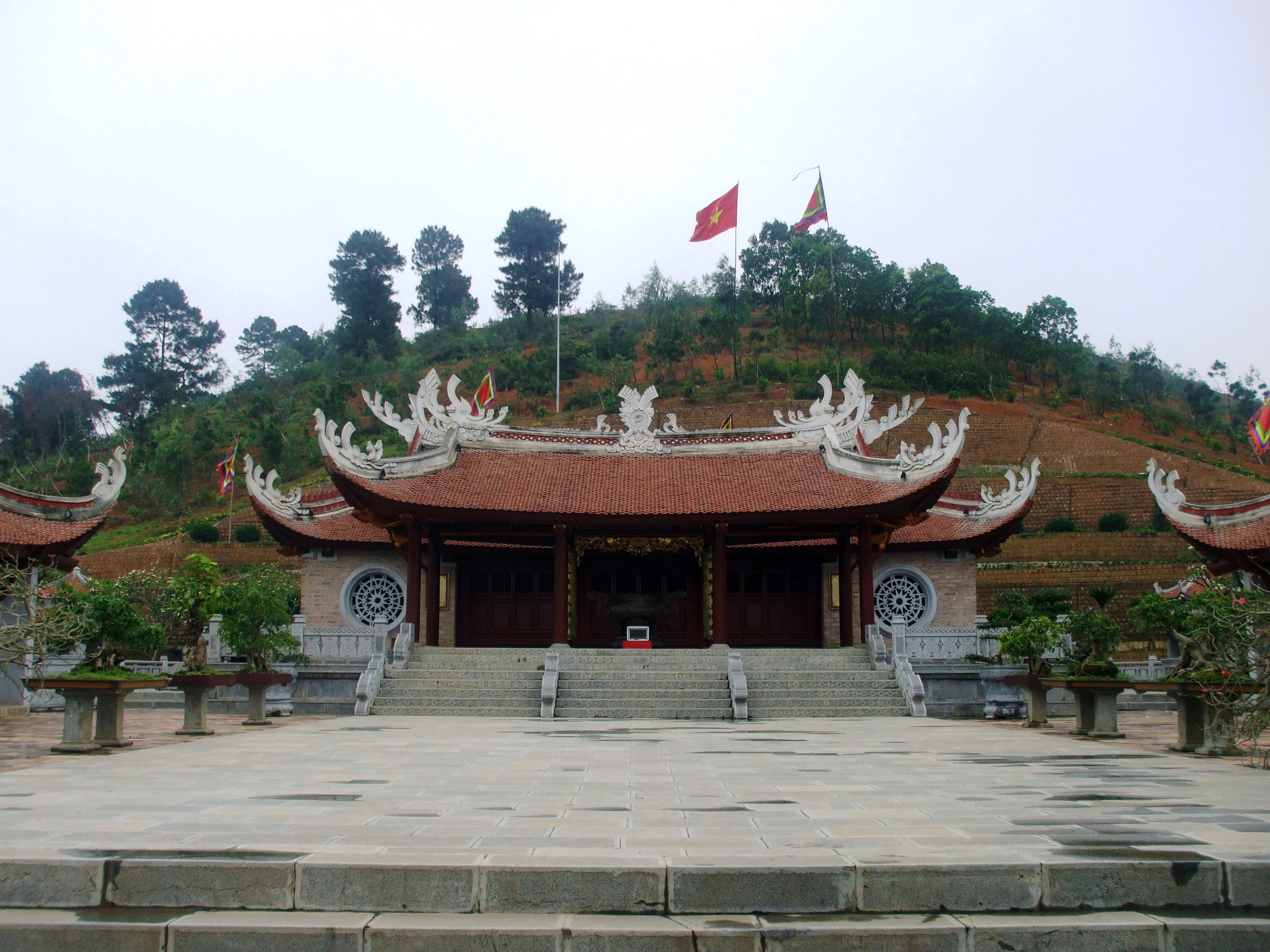
Lạc Long Quân's temple at Sim hill, Phú Thọ

== Vietnamese creation myth ==
Descendant of Dragon and Tiên (Immortal)

Based on the 16th century mythical genealogy Hùng Vương sự tích ngọc phả cổ truyền, Lạc Long Quân is the son of Kinh Dương Vương and Long Mẫu Thần Long, the dragon goddess that rules the sky and the ocean. He was married to Âu Cơ, the daughter of the sixth Flame Emperor Đế Lai. Âu Cơ gave birth to a sac of a hundred eggs, which were hatched into a hundred boys. One day, Quân confessed to her: "I am a descendant of the Dragon, you are descendant of the Tiên (Immortal), fire and water cannot live together in harmony." The two of them then divided their children. Fifty sons followed their mother to the mountainous north, the other fifty followed their father to live in the south; these children are ancestor of Vietnamese. The oldest brother followed Âu Cơ to Phong Châu (Phú Thọ), became Quân's successor and ruled as Hung King. It's the story of the earliest divorce in Vietnamese history.

== Legacy ==
Most cities in Vietnam have named major streets after Lạc Long Quân and Âu Cơ. They are usually at right angles to one another and intersect. He features both in primary education and in some forms of popular religious belief as a god.

== Nội Bình Đà Temple ==
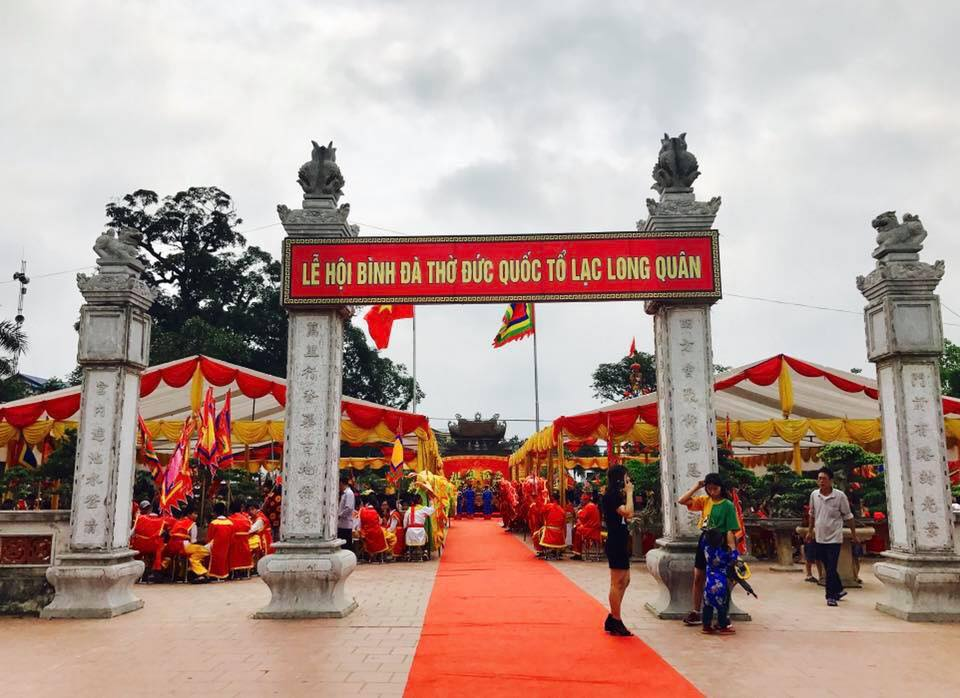
Bình Đà Festival (National Intangible Cultural Heritage) commemorates the ancestor Lạc Long Quân

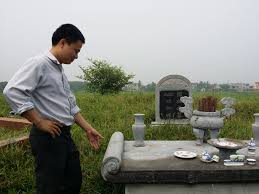
Tomb of the Father of the Nation Lạc Long Quân in Bình Đà

After the Đức Quốc Ancestor ascended to heaven, the mandarins and people built a year-round temple to worship the National Ancestor, now a national monument Nội Temple belongs to Bình Đà, Bình Minh, Thanh Oai, Hanoi. At present, the temple still preserves many precious antiques, including the statue of the National Ancestor Lạc Long Quân and the martial arts officials attending the boat racing festival, and the four-word big letter "VI BÁCH VIỆT TỔ" (meaning the ancestor of "Bách Việt").

In the past, under feudal dynasties, Bình Đà villagers held festivals, emperors sent mandarins from the court and many generals and communes in the region to organize festivals and offer incense to commemorate the National Ancestor. In 1032, Emperor Lý Thái Tông offered a decree to honor Lạc Long Quân:

"Lý triều hiến sắc
Thánh tổ tiên vương
Nhất bào bách noãn
Sinh hạ bách thần
Khai quốc an dân
Vạn xuân an lạc"

"Lý dynasty gives color
Holy Ancestor King
One-celled oocyte
Birth of a Hundred Gods
Opening the nation and the people
Peaceful Spring"

During six centuries, the 16 emperors of the dynasties personally went to Bình Đà to celebrate the National Ancestor's ceremony. There have been 16 decrees honoring Lạc Long Quân as "Khai Quốc Thần" (these offerings are kept at Nội Bình Đà Temple and the National Museum of History).

During festivals, there is a group of thủ từ of Hùng Temple - Phú Thọ to offer incense to the Holy Ancestor and ask for procession of incense at the first incense altar of Nội Temple to welcome the Holy Ancestor, to attend the festival Hùng Temple on the tenth day of the third lunar month.

National relic Nội Temple and National Ancestral Tomb located on sacred land Bình Đà will forever be the place for Lạc Hồng descendants to worship the National Ancestor.

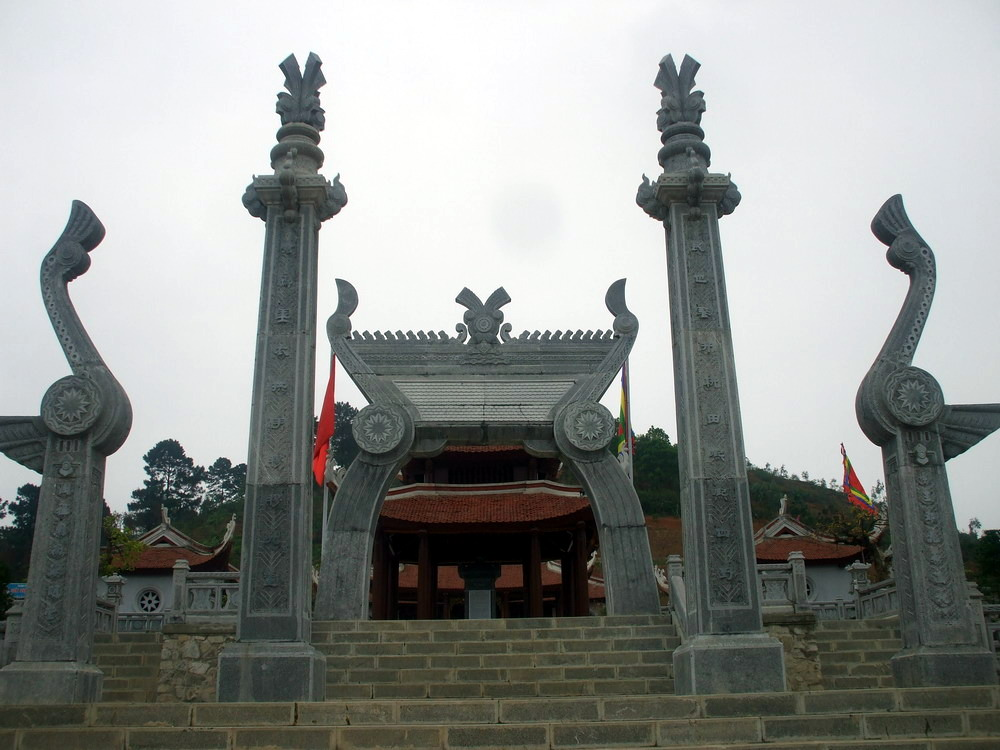
Temple of Lạc Long Quân at Sim hill (Phú Thọ)

== Religion ==
'''Đạo Mo''' is an ancient Vietnamese belief that mentions a similar story.

The Earth God and the Forest God gave birth to a daughter named Shennong. Shennong grew up to marry the son of the Water God and the Storm God name the Dragon God. Because both families hate each other, they try their best to prevent this marriage. The Forest God sent some tree ghosts to harass them, but every tree that came, was cut down by Shennong. The Dragon God used that pile of wood to build a big house for the couple. The Storm God was very angry, so he blew up his son's house. Even so, the Dragon God did not give up, no matter how many times the Storm God blew the house away, the next day the Dragon God continued to build a new house even bigger than before. After an incalculable amount of time, finally built a house that the Storm God could not blow it away, knowing that he could not change his child's mind, so the Storm God returned away. The Dragon God named this house is the wind, implying that the storm is just a small wind that can never shake this house.

Not long after, Shen Nong became pregnant and gave birth to a bag of hundreds of eggs, which gave birth to a hundred children. The Dragon God took care of his wife and children for a while, then he felt homesick and returned to the sea. After that, the Dragon God never came back, and Shennong sadding went to the mountain to look at the sea and wait for her husband forever. As for their children, they split up and live everywhere, they call the place where they live is country to remind them of their roots and keep in touch with each other in the hope that one day their father will return.

== Evaluate ==
The views of Khâm định Việt sử Thông giám cương mục about Lạc Long Quân is:

Vâng tra sử cũ, danh xưng Kinh Dương vương, Lạc Long quân trong 'Hồng Bàng thị kỷ', vốn từ thời thượng cổ, thuộc thuở hồng hoang, tác giả căn cứ vào cái không và làm ra có, sợ rằng không đủ độ tin cậy, lại phụ hội với 'Liễu Nghị truyện' của nhà viết tiểu thuyết đời Đường, lấy đó làm chứng cứ.

— Nguyễn triều Quốc Sử quán

Yes look up the old history, the title Kinh Dương Vương, Lạc Long Quân in 'Hồng Bàng thị kỷ', originally from ancient times, belongs to the time of the wild, the author based on nothing and made yes, afraid that no reliable enough, again with 'Liu Yi Story' by the Tang dynasty novelist, using that as evidence.

— Nguyễn triều Quốc Sử quán

Rehearsing the words of the historical mandarins, Emperor Tự Đức considered these to be "stories referring to buffalo ghosts, snake gods, and myths without standards" and resolutely removed Kinh Dương and Lạc Long from the official history.

Author Liam Christopher Kelley commented:

"Over the centuries, the traditions they [historians] created have become second nature. In fact, in the past half century, under the influence of nationalism, those invented traditions have become and are becoming unchangeable facts."

== See also ==
- List of monarchs of Vietnam
- Hồng Bàng dynasty
- Yue (state)
- Goujian

Lạc Long Quân Hồng Bàng dynasty
Preceded by Kinh Dương Vương	King of Văn Lang	Succeeded by Hùng Quốc Vương
