= Vũ Quỳnh =

Vietnamese scholar-official and writer

- Born: 1452
- Died: 1516 (aged 63–64)

Academic work
- Discipline: History

Vũ Quỳnh (chữ Hán: 武瓊; Bình Giang, Hải Dương 1452–1516) was a Vietnamese scholar-official and writer. He is best known for his work with Kiều Phú collecting the Lĩnh Nam chích quái.

He bore the family name as 武 with origin of the governor of Annam named Vũ Hồn 武浑 during Tang dynasty. He was one of the historians of the Lê dynasty, along with Phạm Công Trứ and Lê Hi, to supplement Ngô Sĩ Liên's history of Đại Việt, Đại Việt sử ký toàn thư.
