= Phan Phu Tiên =

Vietnamese scholar-official and historian

Phan Phu Tiên (chữ Hán: 潘孚先, 1370–1482), was a Vietnamese scholar-official and historian. He was charged by Lê Nhân Tông with writing the annals of the preceding Tran dynasty.

Along with the original Đại Việt sử ký by Lê Văn Hưu, his own continuation Đại Việt sử ký tục biên was the principal base for Ngô Sĩ Liên in preparing the Đại Việt sử ký toàn thư.

== Works ==
- vi:Việt âm thi tập
