= Adoption of Chinese literary culture =

China, Vietnam, Korea and Japan in 1100 AD

Chinese writing, culture and institutions were imported as a whole by Vietnam, Korea, Japan and other neighbouring states over an extended period. Chinese Buddhism spread over East Asia between the 2nd and 5th centuries AD, followed by Confucianism as these countries developed strong central governments modelled on Chinese institutions. In Vietnam and Korea, and for a shorter time in Japan and the Ryukyus, scholar-officials were selected using examinations on the Confucian classics modelled on the Chinese civil service examinations. Shared familiarity with the Chinese classics and Confucian values provided a common framework for intellectuals and ruling elites across the region. All of this was based on the use of Literary Chinese, which became the medium of scholarship and government across the region. Although each of these countries developed vernacular writing systems and used them for popular literature, they continued to use Chinese for all formal writing until it was swept away by rising nationalism around the end of the 19th century.

During the 20th century, several Japanese historians grouped these three countries with China as an East Asian cultural realm. According to Sadao Nishijima, it was characterized by Chinese writing, Mahayana Buddhism in Chinese translation, Confucianism and Chinese legal codes. The concept of an "East Asian world" has seen little interest from scholars in the other countries following its appropriation by Japanese militarists in terms such as the "Greater East Asia Co-prosperity Sphere". Nishijima is also credited with coining the expressions Kanji bunka-ken (漢字文化圏, 'Chinese-character culture sphere') and Chūka bunka-ken (中華文化圏, 'Chinese culture sphere'), which were later borrowed into Chinese. (Note: The phrase bunka-ken (文化圈, 'culture sphere', Chinese wénhuà quān) originated in the 1940s as a translation of the German term Kulturkreis in the work of Fritz Gräbner and Wilhelm Schmidt.) The four countries are also referred to as the "Sinic World" by some authors.

== Literary Chinese ==
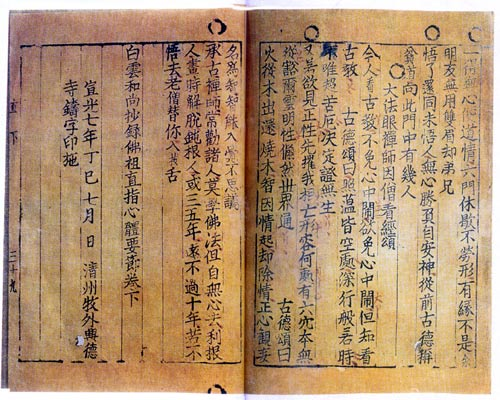
The Korean Buddhist work Jikji is the oldest extant book printed with movable metal type (1377).

At the beginning of the current era, the Chinese script was the only writing system available in East Asia. Classical works of the Warring States period and Han dynasty such as the Mencius, the Commentary of Zuo and Sima Qian's Historical Records were admired as models of prose style through the ages. Later writers sought to emulate the classical style, writing in a form known as Literary Chinese. (Note: Some writers refer to Literary Chinese as "Classical Chinese", but linguists prefer to reserve the latter term for the language of the classics themselves.) Thus the written style, based on the Old Chinese of the classical period, remained largely static as the various varieties of Chinese developed and diverged to become mutually unintelligible, and all distinct from the written form. Moreover, in response to phonetic attrition the spoken varieties developed compound words and new syntactic forms. In comparison, the literary language was admired for its terseness and economy of expression, but it was difficult to understand if read aloud, even in the local pronunciation. This divergence is a classic example of diglossia.

All formal writing in China was done in Literary Chinese until the May Fourth Movement in 1919, after which it was replaced by Written Vernacular Chinese. This new form was based on the vocabulary and grammar of modern Mandarin dialects, particularly the Beijing dialect, and is the written form of Modern Standard Chinese. Literary Chinese persisted for a time in journalism and government, but was replaced there too in the late 1940s.

Buddhism reached China from central Asia in the first century AD, and over the following centuries the Buddhist scriptures were translated into Literary Chinese. Buddhist missionaries then spread these texts throughout East Asia, and students of the new religion learned the language of these sacred texts.

Throughout East Asia, Literary Chinese was the language of administration and scholarship. Although Vietnam, Korea and Japan each developed writing systems for their own languages, these were limited to popular literature. Chinese remained the medium of formal writing until it was displaced by vernacular writing in the late 19th and early 20th centuries. Though they did not use Chinese for spoken communication, each country had its own tradition of reading texts aloud, the so-called Sino-Xenic pronunciations, which provide clues to the pronunciation of Middle Chinese. Chinese words with these pronunciations were also borrowed extensively into the local vernaculars, and today comprise over half their vocabularies.

Thus Literary Chinese became the international language of scholarship in East Asia. Like Latin in Europe it allowed scholars from different lands to communicate, and provided a stock of roots from which compound technical terms could be created. Unlike Latin, Literary Chinese was not used for spoken communication, and lacked the neutrality of Latin, being the language of an extant (and powerful) neighbouring state.

Books in Literary Chinese were widely distributed. By the 7th century and possibly earlier, woodblock printing had been developed in China. At first, it was used only to copy the Buddhist scriptures, but later secular works were also printed. By the 13th century, metal movable type was used by government printers in Korea, but seems not to have been extensively used in China, Vietnam or Japan. At the same time manuscript reproduction remained important until the late 19th century.

== Vietnam ==
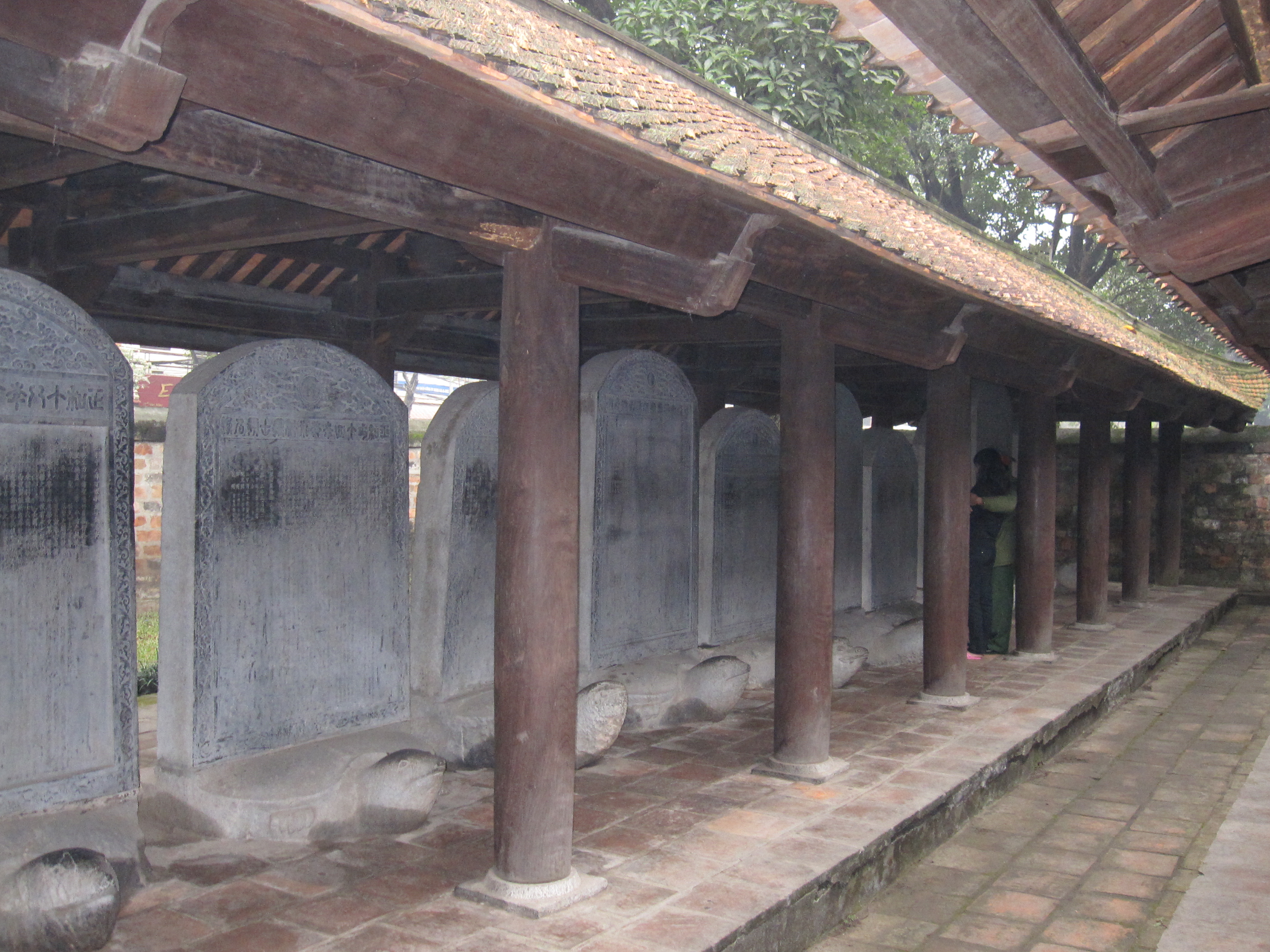
Stelae at the Temple of Literature in Hanoi, recording the names of doctoral graduates in the civil service examinations

The Red River Delta area was occupied by Chinese empires and states for almost all of the period from 111 BC to 938 AD. When Vietnam achieved independence, it continued to use Literary Chinese. At first Buddhist monks dominated government and scholarship in the country. The earliest extant writings by Vietnamese authors are poems from the late 10th century, in Chinese, by the Buddhist monks Lac Thuan and Khuông Việt.

After three short-lived dynasties, the Lý dynasty (1009–1225) was established with the support of Buddhist clergy, but soon came under increasing Confucian influence. A Confucian Temple of Literature was erected in the capital, Hanoi, in 1070. Civil service examinations on the Chinese model began in 1075, and in the following year a college was established for training sons of the ruling elite in the Confucian classics. The influence of Confucian literati grew in the following Trần dynasty (1225–1400) until they had a monopoly on public office, which they kept, almost uninterrupted, until the examination system was abolished by the French colonial administration in 1913.

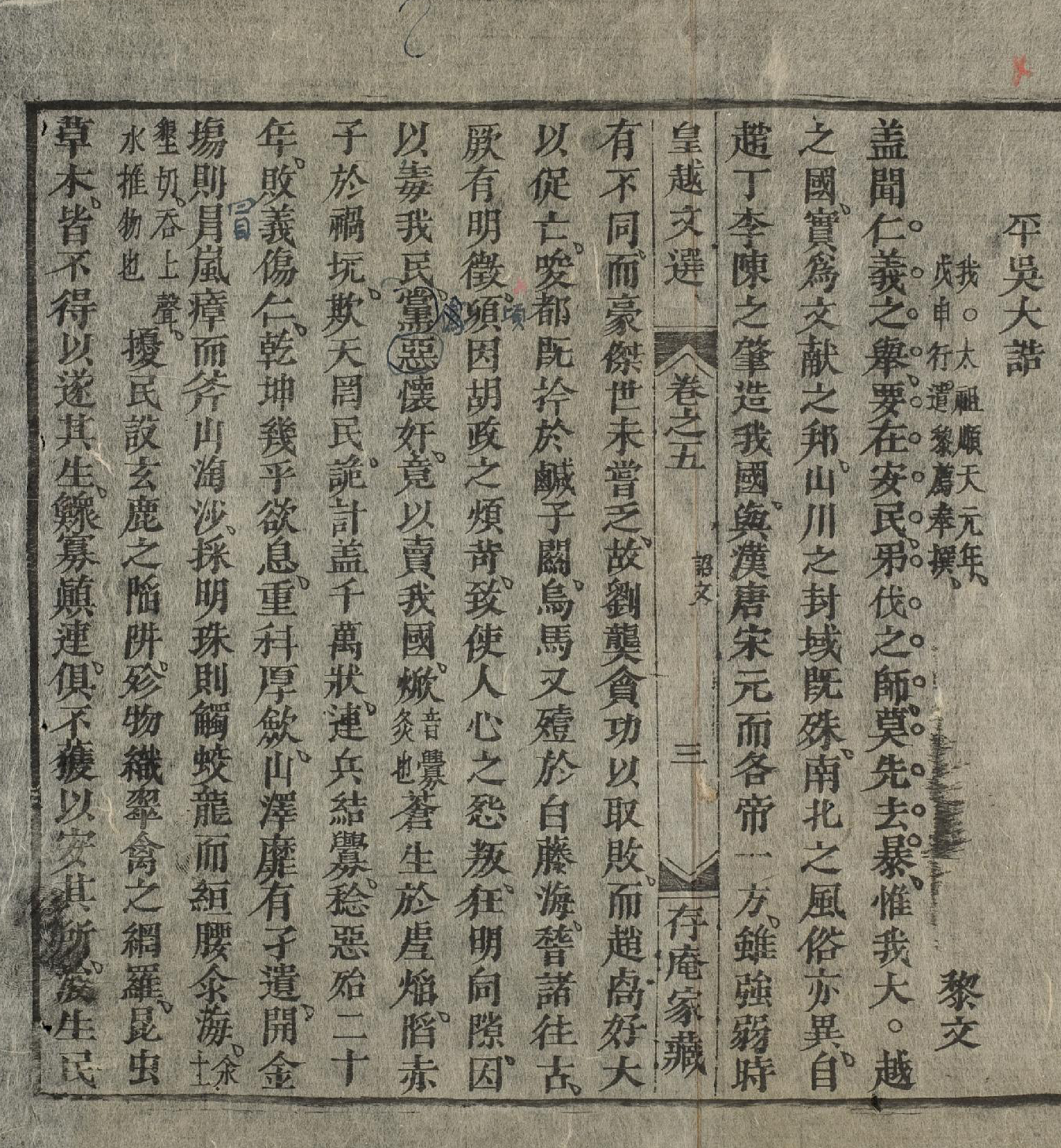
Bình Ngô đại cáo ('Great Proclamation upon the Pacification of the Wu', 1428) written by Nguyễn Trãi in Literary Chinese

Documents that survive from the early Lý dynasty include the Edict on the Transfer of the Capital (to Hanoi) from 1010. When the Chinese invaded the country in 1076, the general Lý Thường Kiệt wrote a 4-line poem Mountains and rivers of the Southern country. His poem was the first of a series of statements of Vietnamese determination to resist northern invaders, all written in Literary Chinese. Others include a Call to the Officers of the Army (1285), Return to the Capital (1288), the Great Proclamation upon the Pacification of the Wu (1428) and an Address to the Army (1789). Historical annals, beginning with the Annals of Đại Việt, were also written in Chinese, as were poetry and fiction of various kinds.

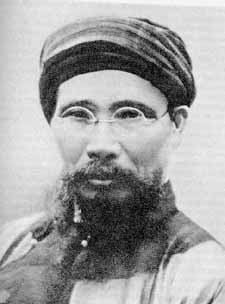
The Vietnamese nationalist Phan Bội Châu (1867–1940) wrote in Literary Chinese.

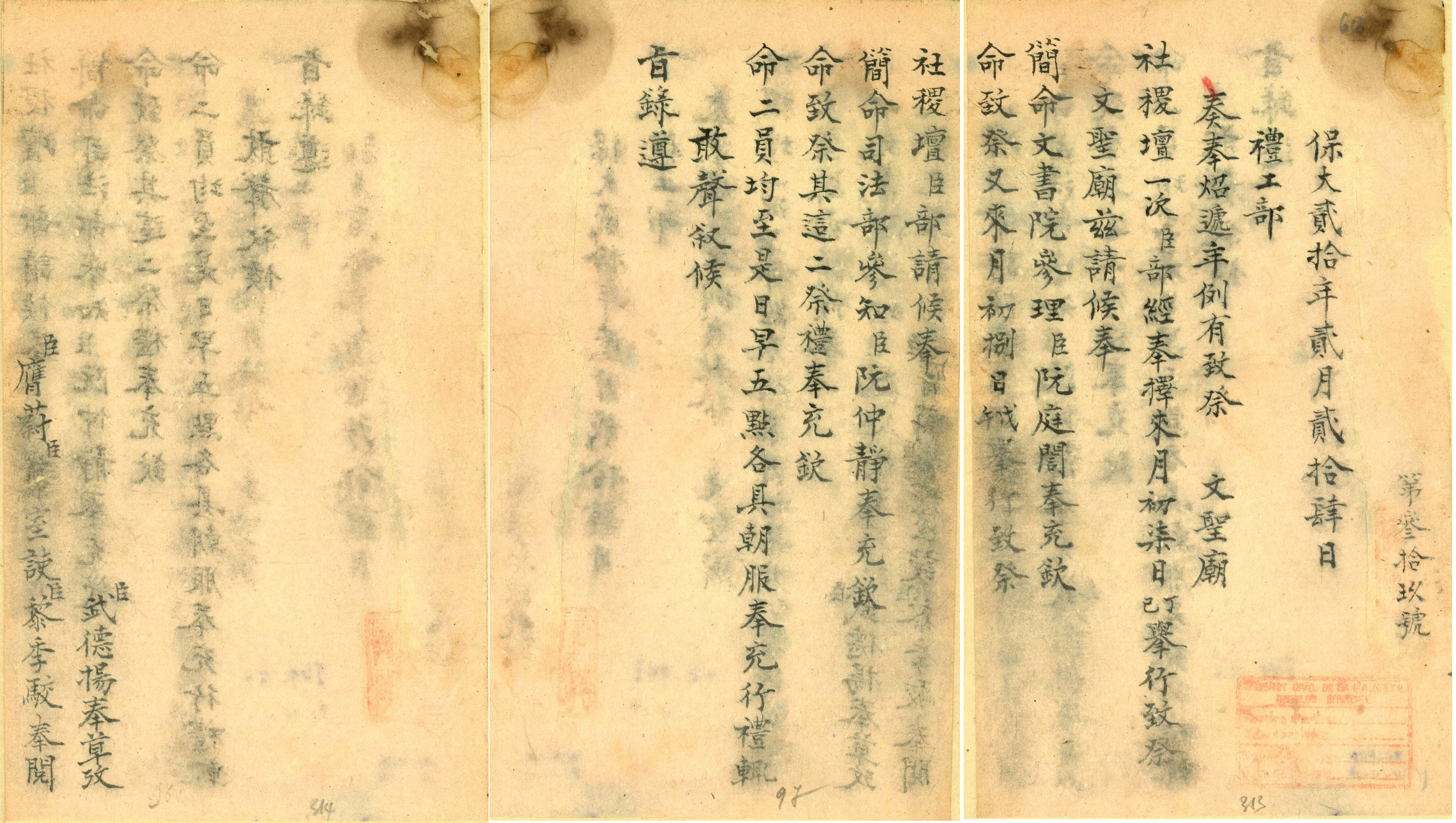
A document issued by the Ministry of Rites and Public Works of the Nguyễn dynasty on selecting a day for a sacrifice at the Đàn Xã Tắc in Huế written in literary Chinese, dated Bảo Đại 20 (1945).

In the centuries after independence, Vietnamese authors adapted Chinese characters (Chữ Hán) to produce a script for their own language. This script, called Chữ Nôm, was quite complex, and accessible only to those who could read Chinese. Over the centuries it became the vehicle for a flourishing vernacular literature, but all formal writing continued to be in Literary Chinese, except during two short-lived attempts at reform. When Hồ Quý Ly seized the throne in 1400, as well as pursuing a programme of land reform, he sought to break the power of the Confucian literati by making Vietnamese the state language and translating the classics to make them available to all. This was reversed in 1407 after Ming China invaded the country. Similar reforms were attempted by Nguyễn Huệ from 1788, but were again reversed at the beginning of the succeeding Nguyễn dynasty (1802–1945). Finally both Literary Chinese and Chữ Nôm were replaced by the Latin-based Vietnamese alphabet in the early 20th century.

Vietnamese intellectuals continued to use Literary Chinese into the early 20th century. For example, the nationalist Phan Bội Châu (1867–1940) wrote his History of the Loss of Vietnam (1905) and other tracts in Literary Chinese, and also used it to communicate when in Japan and China, as he spoke neither Japanese nor Chinese.

== Korea ==
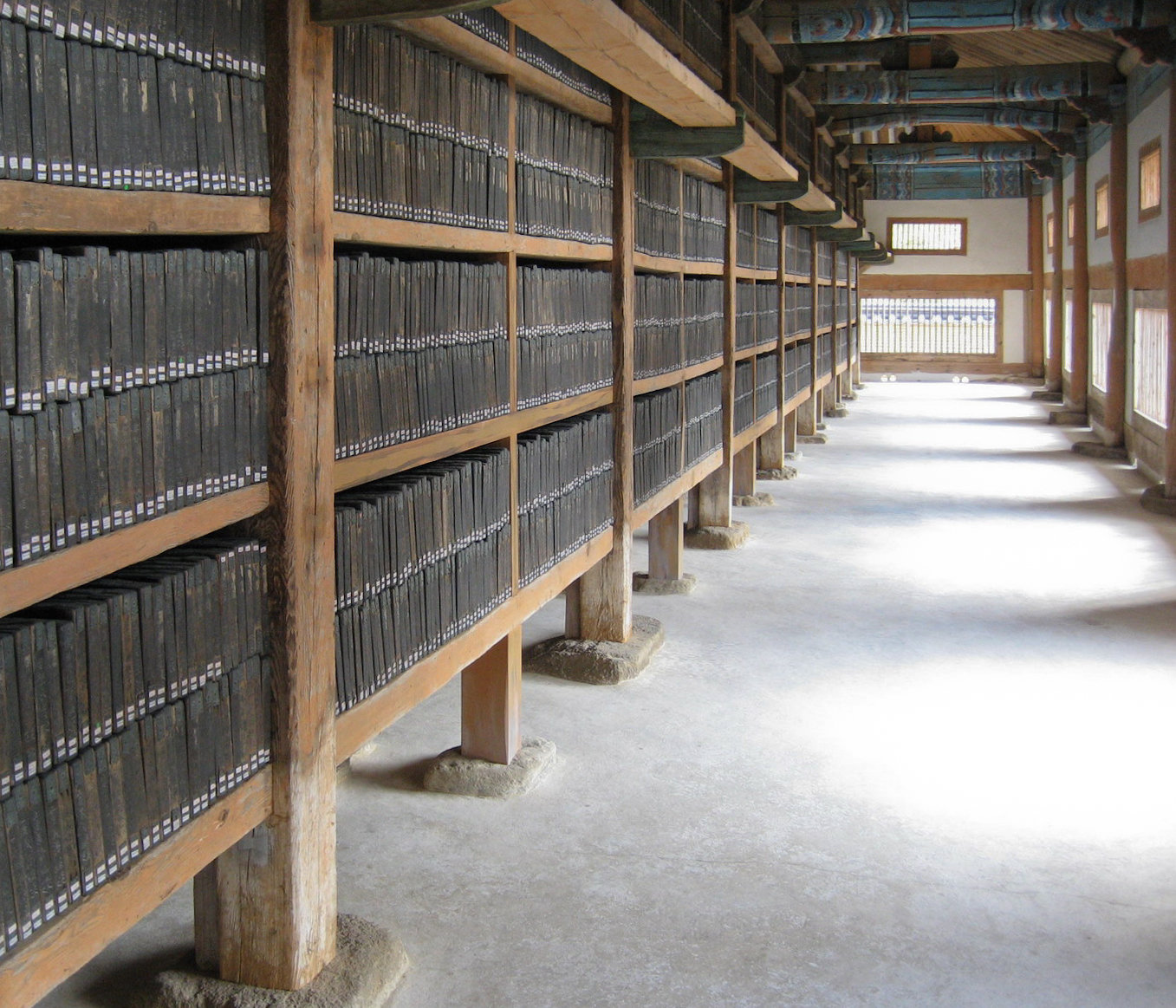
The Tripitaka Koreana, a Korean collection of the Chinese Buddhist canon

Chinese was first introduced to Korea in the first century BC, when the Han dynasty invaded the northern part of the peninsula and established the Four Commanderies. Buddhism arrived in Korea from China in the late 4th century, and spread from there to Japan. The Goguryeo kingdom strengthened itself by adopting Chinese institutions, laws and culture, including Buddhism. The influential Korean Buddhist scholar Wonhyo (617–686) wrote extensively in Chinese.

The use of Literary Chinese grew after the unification of the country by Silla in the late 7th century. A national institute (the Gukhak) was set up in 682 to teach the Chinese classics. Places and official positions were given Chinese names (with Sino-Korean pronunciation) so that they could be used in Literary Chinese. Civil service examinations on the Confucian classics were introduced in 958.

During the Goryeo period (918–1392), Korean scribes added interlinear annotations known as gugyeol ('oral embellishment') to Chinese texts to allow them to be read in Korean word order with Korean glosses. Many of the gugyeol characters were abbreviated, and some of them are identical in form and value to symbols in the Japanese katakana syllabary, though the historical relationship between the two is not yet clear. An even more subtle method of annotation known as gakpil (角筆 'stylus') was discovered in 2000, consisting of dots and lines made with a stylus.

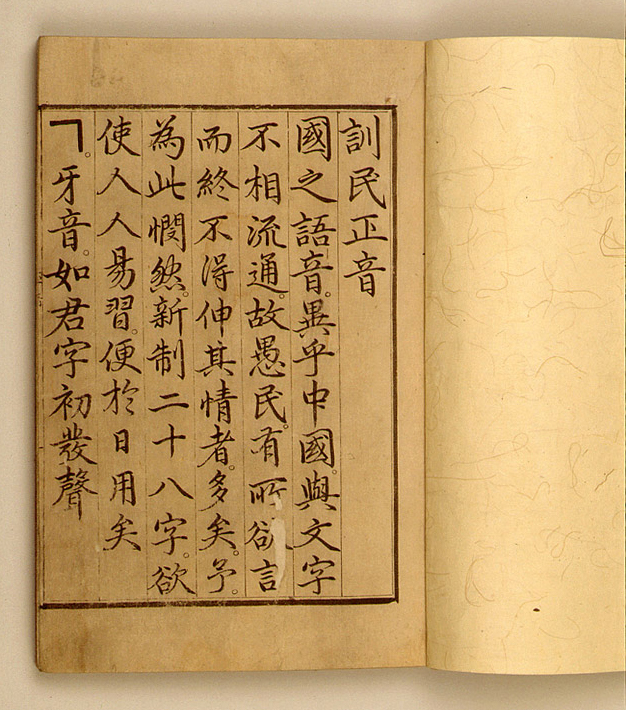
King Sejong's proclamation of the Hangul script, written in Classical Chinese

All formal writing, including the official annals of the Korean dynasties and almost all government documents, was done in Chinese until the late 19th century. So too were the works of the Confucian scholars T'oegye and Yulgok in the 16th century and Chŏng Yagyong at the end of the 18th. Several fiction genres were written in Chinese, including romances, beginning with the 15th century New Stories from Gold Turtle Mountain. The Ŏu yadam (c. 1600) began a new genre of unofficial histories, which became very popular in the 18th and 19th centuries.

Early attempts to write the Korean language used a number of complex and unwieldy systems collectively known as Idu, using Chinese characters both for their meaning and their sound. The Hangul alphabet announced in 1446 brought Korean reading and writing within reach of virtually the entire population. King Sejong's announcement of the new script, The Correct Sounds for the Instruction of the People, was itself written in Literary Chinese like most such documents, and described the new letters in terms of Chinese metaphysics. Although the new script was clearly more efficient, it was limited to informal writing and recording of folk tales until, as part of the Gabo Reform in December 1894, the civil examinations were abolished and government documents were required to be printed in Korean. Even then Korean was written with a composite script, with Chinese characters (Hanja) for the Sino-Korean words that now made up over half the vocabulary of the language interspersed with Hangul for native words and suffixes. Hanja are still taught in schools in both parts of Korea, but fell out of use in North Korea in the late 1940s, and are increasingly rarely used in South Korea.

== Japan ==
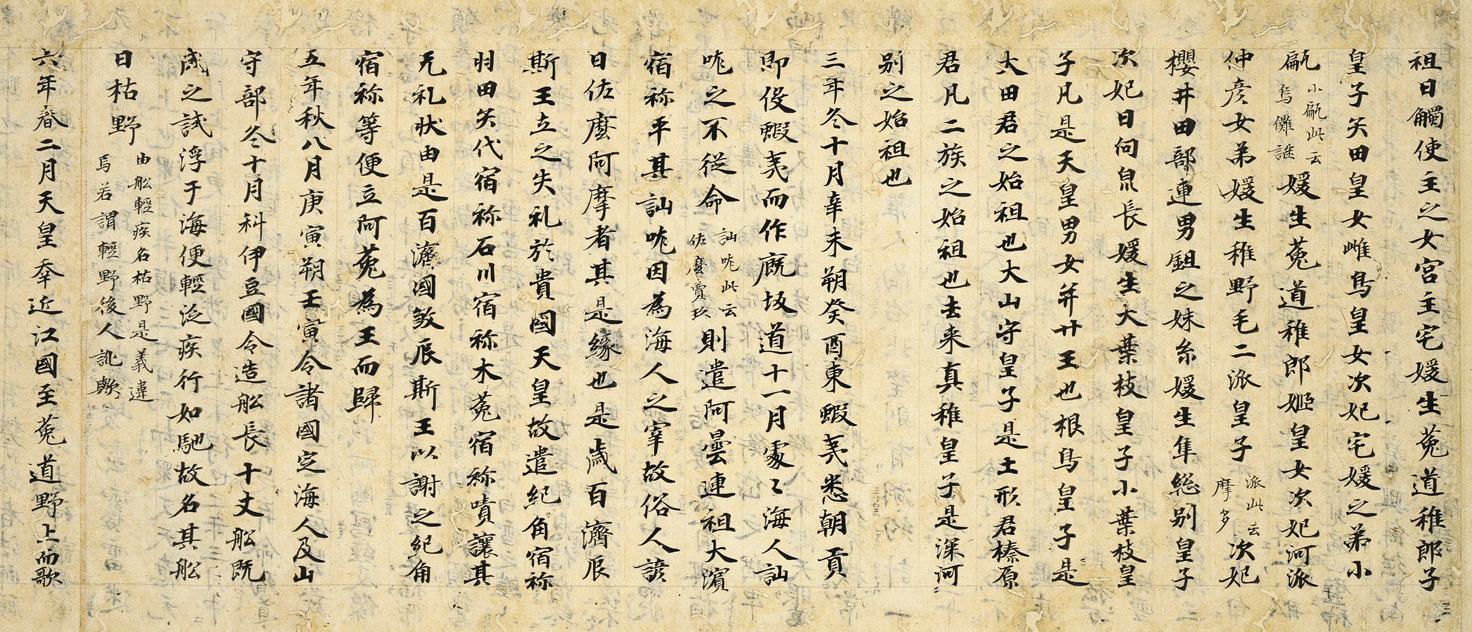
Nihon Shoki, an 8th-century history of Japan written in Chinese

Unlike Vietnam and Korea, no part of Japan was ever occupied by China. Chinese writing was brought to Japan by Buddhist missionaries from Korea, probably around the 4th or 5th centuries. The early 8th century histories Nihon Shoki and Kojiki credit a scholar called Wani from Baekje with first bringing the Confucian classics to Japan, though many scholars have questioned this account. By 607 Japan had opened direct contacts with Sui dynasty China, continued under the following Tang dynasty, and proceeded to import Chinese language and culture wholesale. Even the layout of the Japanese capital of Nara was modelled on the Tang capital Chang'an.

All formal writing during the Nara (710–794) and Heian (794–1185) periods was done in Literary Chinese. The earliest collection of Chinese poetry by Japanese authors (Kanshi) was the Kaifūsō, compiled in 751. A series of Six National Histories in the Chinese style, covering the period to 887, were written in the Nara and Heian periods. A seventh was begun but abandoned in the 10th century. The Ritsuryō (757) and Engi shiki (927) were legal codes on the Chinese model. As Japanese is very different from Chinese, with inflections and different word order, Japanese scholars developed kanbun kundoku, an elaborate method of annotating Literary Chinese so that it could be re-arranged and read as Japanese.

There had been experiments with adapting Chinese characters to write Japanese since the 7th century, and by the early 10th century these had been simplified to the kana syllabaries still in use today. However Chinese had such prestige in the Heian period that only women and low-status men wrote in Japanese. As a result, court women produced much of the Japanese-language fiction of the period, with the most famous being the Tale of Genji.

Around 700, an imperial academy (the Daigaku-ryō) was founded to train the sons of the aristocracy in Chinese and the classics and to administer the first stage of civil service examinations. It flourished in the 9th century but went into decline in the 10th, as the central bureaucracy and use of Chinese faded away. By 1135 the site was overgrown; the buildings were destroyed in the great fire of 1177. By the 13th century knowledge of Literary Chinese had become so limited that the government had to delegate official writing, including correspondence before the unsuccessful Mongol invasions of Japan, to the Buddhist clergy.

The re-establishment of strong central government by the Tokugawa shogunate in 1600 was followed by a revival of Confucianism. Literary Chinese remained the preferred medium for formal writing until the late 19th century. A style mixing Chinese and Japanese elements (sōrōbun) was derived from the medieval hentai-kanbun ('variant Chinese writing') used in such works as the historical chronicle Azuma Kagami (1266). It was used during the Meiji period, and as late as the end of the Second World War, by men for diaries and correspondence, and for various public notices. Both have since been replaced by writing in Japanese, using a script combining Chinese characters (kanji) and kana syllabaries.

== Other states ==
In the Tang period, other neighbouring states adopted Chinese culture and institutions, including using Chinese as the written language of administration, both to cultivate good relations with China and to strengthen their own administrations. The kingdom of Balhae, established in northern Korea and eastern Manchuria in 698, followed its southern neighbour Silla in establishing a Chinese-style administration. During the reign of King Mun (737–793), the state imported Chinese literary culture and institutions wholesale. Similarly, the kingdom of Nanzhao to the southwest used Chinese as the language of administration and adopted Tang laws and procedures. By adopting Chinese institutions, these states became stronger and more stable than their predecessors. They observed the formalities of tribute to the Tang, but functioned as independent states. Almost all texts from the Dali Kingdom, which succeeded Nanzhao, are written in Chinese.

In the late 14th century, the three principalities on Okinawa opened relations with Ming China. In 1393, a community of clerks and craftsmen from Fujian was established at Kume, near the port of Naha in the central kingdom of Chūzan. The clerks taught the Chinese written language, and served the government in its relations with China. From the late 14th century, selected sons of the nobility of Chūzan, and later the unified Ryukyu Kingdom, were sent to the Guozijian in the Ming capital to study the Chinese classics. On their return they would occupy high offices in the government. Local forms of examination in the Chinese classics were also used to select candidates for high office. However, by the 17th century Japanese influence had become predominant, and the use of Chinese was limited and artificial. By the mid-19th century, the Kume school teaching the Chinese classics had been overshadowed as an educator of future administrators by an academy in the capital of Shuri teaching in Japanese.

== See also ==
- Brushtalk
