= Phạm Công Trứ =

Vietnamese scholar-official and historian (c. 1600-1675)

Phạm Công Trứ (chữ Hán: 范公著, c. 1600–1675) was a Lê dynasty Vietnamese scholar-official and historian. He was one of the scholar-historians of the Lê dynasty along with Vũ Quỳnh and Lê Hi (vi) to supplement Ngô Sĩ Liên's Đại Việt sử ký toàn thư.
