= Đại Việt sử lược =

1377 history book

Đại Việt sử lược 大越史略
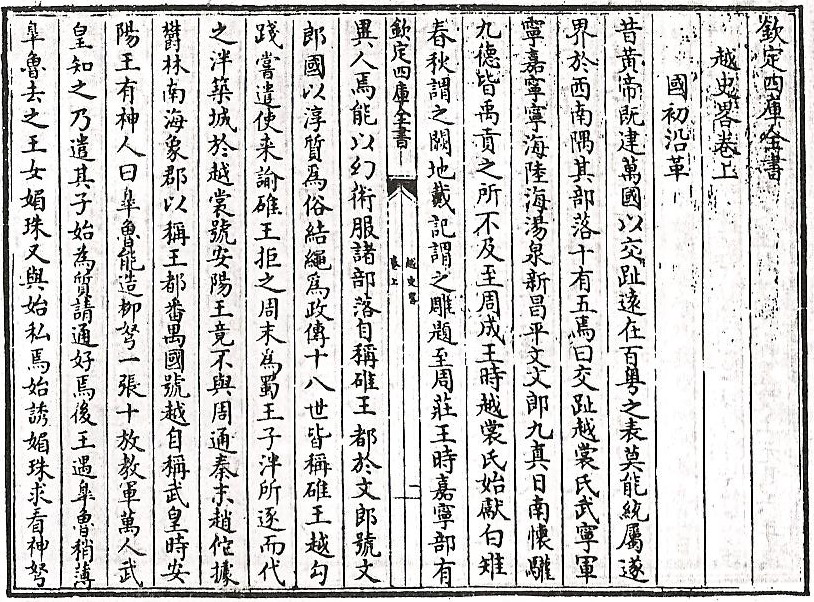
- Copy of the Đại Việt sử lược, in the Siku Quanshu
- Original title: 大越史略
- Language: Văn ngôn
- Subject: History of Vietnam
- Genre: Historiography
- Publisher: Trần dynasty
- Publication date: r. 1377
- Publication place: Đại Việt

The Đại Việt sử lược (chữ Hán: 大越史略; lit. Abridged Chronicles of Đại Việt) or Việt sử lược (chữ Hán: 越史略; lit. Abridged Chronicles of Viet) is an historical text that was compiled during the Trần dynasty. The three-book work was finished around 1377 and covers the history of Vietnam from the reign of Triệu Đà to the collapse of the Lý dynasty. During the Fourth Chinese domination of Vietnam, the book, together with almost all official records of the Trần dynasty, was taken away to China and subsequently collected in the Siku Quanshu. The Đại Việt sử lược is considered the earliest chronicle about the history of Vietnam that remains today.

== History of compilation ==
The exact date of the compilation of the Đại Việt sử lược is unknown, but due to the last record of the book, which was the era name of Trần Phế Đế, the compilation was likely finished around 1377. The author of the book is unknown as well, but there are several sources who claim it was the historian Sử Hy Nhan who took charge of the compilation. Ranked first in the 1363 imperial examination, Sử Hy Nhan was so famous for his knowledge of history that the Trần emperor decided to change his family name from Trần to Sử (which means "history" in Vietnamese). Another source reckoned that the Đại Việt sử lược was a condensed version of the Đại Việt sử ký, which was written by Lê Văn Hưu in 1272, or only the book Việt chí (Annals of Viet) by Trần Phổ with the supplements of Trần dynasty's era names, but they could not verify these two hypotheses because of the lack of historical evidence.

During the Fourth Chinese domination, many valuable books of Đại Việt were taken away by the Ming dynasty, including the Đại Việt sử ký, and subsequently were lost. Although being transferred to China, the Đại Việt sử lược was still preserved in its original form and was published in the Siku Quanshu of the Qing dynasty under the name Việt sử lược; the first character Đại (大, means Great) was left out to suit the Chinese notion of propriety and historical tradition. Therefore, the book is considered the earliest annals about history of Vietnam that remains today and the most important book which was brought back to Vietnam from China. In 1978, the Đại Việt sử lược became the first historical book of Vietnam that was translated directly from chữ Hán to Russian.

== Contents ==
The Đại Việt sử lược was written in chữ Hán and covered the history of Vietnam from the reign of Triệu Đà (2nd century BCE) to the collapse of the Lý dynasty (1225) with a supplemental list of era names of Trần emperors from Trần Thái Tông to Trần Phế Đế. The contents of the Đại Việt sử lược were divided into three volumes (quyển): The first called Quốc sơ diên cách corresponded with the period from the foundation of Văn Lang, the first nation of Vietnam in the 7th century BCE to the 12 Lords Rebellion (10th century); the second and third books were named Nguyễn kỷ (Period of the Nguyễn) and narrated the reign of the Lý dynasty with the royal family name Lý was changed to Nguyễn by the Trần dynasty in order to avoid the given name of Trần Lý, grandfather of the emperor Trần Thái Tông, and make people forget the former dynasty. The quality of compilation of the Đại Việt sử lược was not coherent; there were periods which were recorded in detail but also some very brief sections. The author of the Đại Việt sử lược appeared to attach special importance to the reign of the Lý dynasty with extensive records while the compilation of the period up to the middle of the 10th century was mainly based on Chinese sources.
