= Đại Việt sử ký =

History of the Trần dynasty by Lê Văn Hưu

Đại Việt sử ký 大越史記
- Author: Lê Văn Hưu
- Original title: 大越史記
- Language: Văn ngôn
- Subject: History of Vietnam
- Genre: Historiography
- Publisher: Trần dynasty
- Publication date: 1272
- Publication place: Đại Việt
- Followed by: Đại Việt sử ký toàn thư

The Đại Việt sử ký (Vietnamese: [ɗâːjˀ vìət ʂɨ᷉ kǐ], chữ Hán: 大越史記, Annals of Đại Việt) was the official historical text of the Trần dynasty, that was compiled by the royal historian Lê Văn Hưu and was finished in 1272. Considered the first comprehensive account of the history of Vietnam, the 30-volume book covered the period between 207 BC to 1225 AD in Vietnamese history, from Triệu Đà, the first king of the Triệu dynasty, to Lý Chiêu Hoàng which was the empress regnant and the last ruler of the Lý dynasty. Although it was lost during the Fourth Chinese domination in Vietnam, the contents of the Đại Việt sử ký, including Lê Văn Hưu's comments about various events in the history of Vietnam, were used by other Vietnamese historians as a base for their works, notably the Đại Việt sử ký toàn thư by Ngô Sĩ Liên.

== History of compilation ==
Lê Văn Hưu was a renowned scholar and an official of the royal court of the Trần dynasty during the reign of Trần Thái Tông and Trần Thánh Tông who promoted him to the position of Hàn Lâm viện học sĩ (是翰林學士, Member of the Hanlin Academy) and Quốc sử viện giám tu (Supervisor of the royal bureau for historical records). It was the Emperor Thái Tông who commissioned Lê Văn Hưu to compile the official historical text of the Trần dynasty named Đại Việt sử ký. The 30-volume (quyển) text was completed and offered to the Emperor Trần Thánh Tông in January 1272 and was praised by Thánh Tông for its quality. Lê Tắc in his An Nam chí lược suggested that the Đại Việt sử ký was compiled by Lê Văn Hưu in revising the book Việt chí (越志, Records of Việt) which was written by Trần Phổ after the order of Trần Thái Tông.

During the Fourth Chinese domination, many valuable books of Đại Việt were taken away by the Ming dynasty including the Đại Việt sử ký, hence the book was subsequently lost. However, the contents of the Đại Việt sử ký and Lê Văn Hưu's comments about various historical events was collected by the historian Phan Phu Tiên, who used them to write the first official annals of the Lê dynasty at the order of the Emperor Lê Nhân Tông in 1455. The new Đại Việt sử ký of Phan Phu Tiên supplemented the period from 1223 with the coronation of Trần Thái Tông to 1427 and with the retreat of the Ming dynasty after the victory of Lê Lợi. Phan Phu Tiên's 10-volume work had other names such as Đại Việt sử ký tục biên (大越史記續編序, Supplementary Edition of the Annals of Đại Việt) or Quốc sử biên lục. Afterwards, the historian Ngô Sĩ Liên based on the works of Lê Văn Hưu and Phan Phu Tiên to write his essential book the Đại Việt sử ký toàn thư which was compiled in 6 volumes and finished in 1479.

Việt sử lược (Brief History of Việt), the surviving book of Vietnam during the occupation of the Ming dynasty is also considered a condensed version of the Đại Việt sử ký.

== Contents ==
Since the original version of the Đại Việt sử ký was absorbed in the works of Phan Phu Tiên and Ngô Sĩ Liên, it is difficult to distinguish which part was written by Lê Văn Hưu and which ones were compiled by the others. They only know that Lê Văn Hưu chose the foundation of the Kingdom of Nam Việt (南越) in 207 BC by Triệu Đà as the starting point for the history of Vietnam and finished his work with the reign of Lý Chiêu Hoàng from 1224 to 1225. The only original contents of the Đại Việt sử ký which still remained in other books were Lê Văn Hưu's 30 comments on various events in history of Vietnam:

Time	Event	Period	Note
137 BC	Death of Triệu Vũ vương	First Chinese domination	
111 BC	Collapse of the Triệu dynasty	First Chinese domination	
42	Revolt of the Trưng Sisters against the Han dynasty	Second Chinese domination	
186	End of the domination of the Han dynasty	Second Chinese domination	
210	End of the ruling of Shi Xie	Second Chinese domination	
432	Invasion of Vietnam by the kingdom of Lâm Ấp	Second Chinese domination	
548	Death of Lý Nam Đế	Early Lý dynasty	
866	Construction of Đại La by Cao Biền	Third Chinese domination	
944	Death of Ngô Quyền	Ngô dynasty	
950	Restoration of the throne from Dương Tam Kha by Ngô Xương Văn	Ngô dynasty	
965	Death of Ngô Xương Văn	Ngô dynasty	
968	Enthronement of Đinh Tiên Hoàng	Đinh dynasty	
970	Coronation of Đinh Tiên Hoàng's 5 empresses	Đinh dynasty	
981	Enthronement of Lê Đại Hành	Early Lê dynasty	
1005	Death of Lê Đại Hành	Early Lê dynasty	
1005	Usurpation of the throne from Lê Long Việt by his brother Lê Long Đĩnh	Early Lê dynasty	
1009	Coronation of Lý Thái Tổ	Lý dynasty	
1010	Change of capital from Hoa Lư to Thăng Long by Lý Thái Tổ	Lý dynasty	
1028	Succession of Lý Thái Tông	Lý dynasty	
1028	Burial of Lý Thái Tổ	Lý dynasty	
1034	Reform of the rule of calling in the royal court of the Lý dynasty by Lý Thái Tông	Lý dynasty	
1039	Change of Lý Thái Tông's imperial title	Lý dynasty	
1043	Rebellion of Nùng Trí Cao	Lý dynasty	
1128	Death of Lý Nhân Tông	Lý dynasty	
1128	Victory of Lý Nhân Tông against the kingdom of Chân Lạp	Lý dynasty	
1129	Coronation of Sùng Hiền Hầu as Retired Emperor (Thái thượng hoàng) by order of Lý Thần Tông	Lý dynasty	
1129	Appointment of Lý Tử Khắc for the position of Military Commander (Khu mật sứ)	Lý dynasty	
1130	Imposition of Lý Thần Tông on selecting imperial concubines	Lý dynasty	
1150	Rise of Đỗ Anh Vũ in the royal court of the Lý dynasty	Lý dynasty	
1154	Marriage between Lý Anh Tông and a daughter of the king of Champa	Lý dynasty	

== Historical perspectives ==
They [ Trưng Sisters ] proclaimed themselves queens as easily as turning over their hands, which shows that our land of Viet was able to establish a royal tradition. What a pity that, for a thousand years after this, the men of our land bowed their heads, folded their arms, and served the northerners; how shameful this is in comparison with the two Trưng Sisters, who were women. Ah, it is enough to make one want to die.

— Lê Văn Hưu, Đại Việt sử ký, cited in Ngô Sĩ Liên, Đại Việt sử ký toàn thư, "Era of Trưng Nữ vương"

Considered the first comprehensive historical record of the history of Vietnam, Đại Việt sử ký was compiled by Lê Văn Hưu in following the format of Sima Guang's Zizhi Tongjian (资治通鉴, Comprehensive Mirror to Aid in Government). During the period of compilation, Lê Văn Hưu had chance to witness one of the principal events of the Trần dynasty which was the war of resistance of Đại Việt against the second and third Mongol invasions. With the continuous threat from the northern border, Thái Tông and Thánh Tông commissioned Lê Văn Hưu to write the historical text so that the Trần clan could learn experiences from Đại Việt's past to enforce its ruling and affirm the independence of the country from China.

These purposes of the emperors and Lê Văn Hưu explained why the historian chose the foundation of the Kingdom of Nam Việt in 207 BC by Triệu Đà as the starting point for the history of Vietnam, an opinion which was challenged by several Vietnamese historians from Ngô Thì Sĩ in eighteenth century to modern historians because the kings of Nam Việt were of Chinese origin. Based on the independence of Nam Việt from the Han dynasty, Lê Văn Hưu considered its founder Triệu Đà the first and fine example of a Vietnamese ruler caring for the independence of the country. Another example for Lê Văn Hưu's interest in the theme of Vietnam's equality with China was his remark on the enthronement in 968 of Đinh Tiên Hoàng who was considered by Lê Văn Hưu the successor of Triệu Đà in reclaiming the identity of Vietnam while actually it was Ngô Quyền who marked the end of the northern domination in Vietnam in 938 with his victory in the Battle of Bạch Đằng. According to the historian, it was Đinh Tiên Hoàng and not Ngô Quyền who had the major contribution in re-establishing the independent status of the country from China because Ngô Quyền was content only with the position of King (Vương) while Đinh Tiền Hoàng took a further step in designating himself as the emperor (Hoàng đế) of the country and was thus equal to the emperor of the Song dynasty.

Since Lê Văn Hưu highly treasured the independence of Vietnam, he often had negative comments on historical figures who was considered by Lê Văn Hưu being more or less responsible for the loss of the country's autonomy to its northern neighbour such as the chancellor Lữ Gia of Nam Việt or Lý Nam Đế. While the contemporary opinion praised Lý Nam Đế as a national hero of Vietnam for his revolt against the Liang dynasty, Lê Văn Hưu criticized Lý Nam Đế's ability because he was ultimately defeated and hence Vietnam lost its independence one more time. However, Lê Văn Hưu saved his best praise for the Trưng Sisters who led the resistance movement against the Han dynasty and were finally put down by the army of Ma Yuan in 42. In Lê Văn Hưu's words, the men of Vietnam had to feel ashamed of their surrender to the northerners while the Trưng Sisters, who were women, fiercely fought for the country. About Chinese rulers of Vietnam, Lê Văn Hưu gave favorable remarks for ones who contributed to the stability of the country, the historian respectfully called the prefect Sĩ Nhiếp as Sĩ Vương (King Sĩ) who kept the autonomous status of Vietnam from the direct administration of the Eastern Wu for a long period.

Beside the concern for the identity of the country, Lê Văn Hưu also paid special importance to the ability in reigning the country of Vietnamese rulers from Ngô Quyền to Lý Anh Tông with his comments from a Confucianist standpoint. He criticized Lý Thái Tổ for having built many Buddhist pagodas instead of saving those resources for the country and his people. The coronation of Sùng Hiền hầu as Retired Emperor (Thái thượng hoàng) of the Lý dynasty in 1129 by Lý Thần Tông was given a negative remark by Lê Văn Hưu for the lack of Confucianist hierarchy in the royal family because Thần Tông should have given the title to his predecessor Lý Nhân Tông instead of his biological father. However, Lê Văn Hưu's emphasis of Confucianism was much less than Ngô Sĩ Liên in his Đại Việt sử ký toàn thư which was an historical text almost purely based on a Confucianist point of view because the main interest of Lê Văn Hưu was always Vietnam's independence from and equality with its northern neighbour China. Therefore, Lê Văn Hưu's Đại Việt sử ký was considered an essential work in affirming an autonomous identity for Vietnam.
