= Lê Văn Hưu =

Vietnamese historian (1230–1322)

Lê Văn Hưu 黎文休
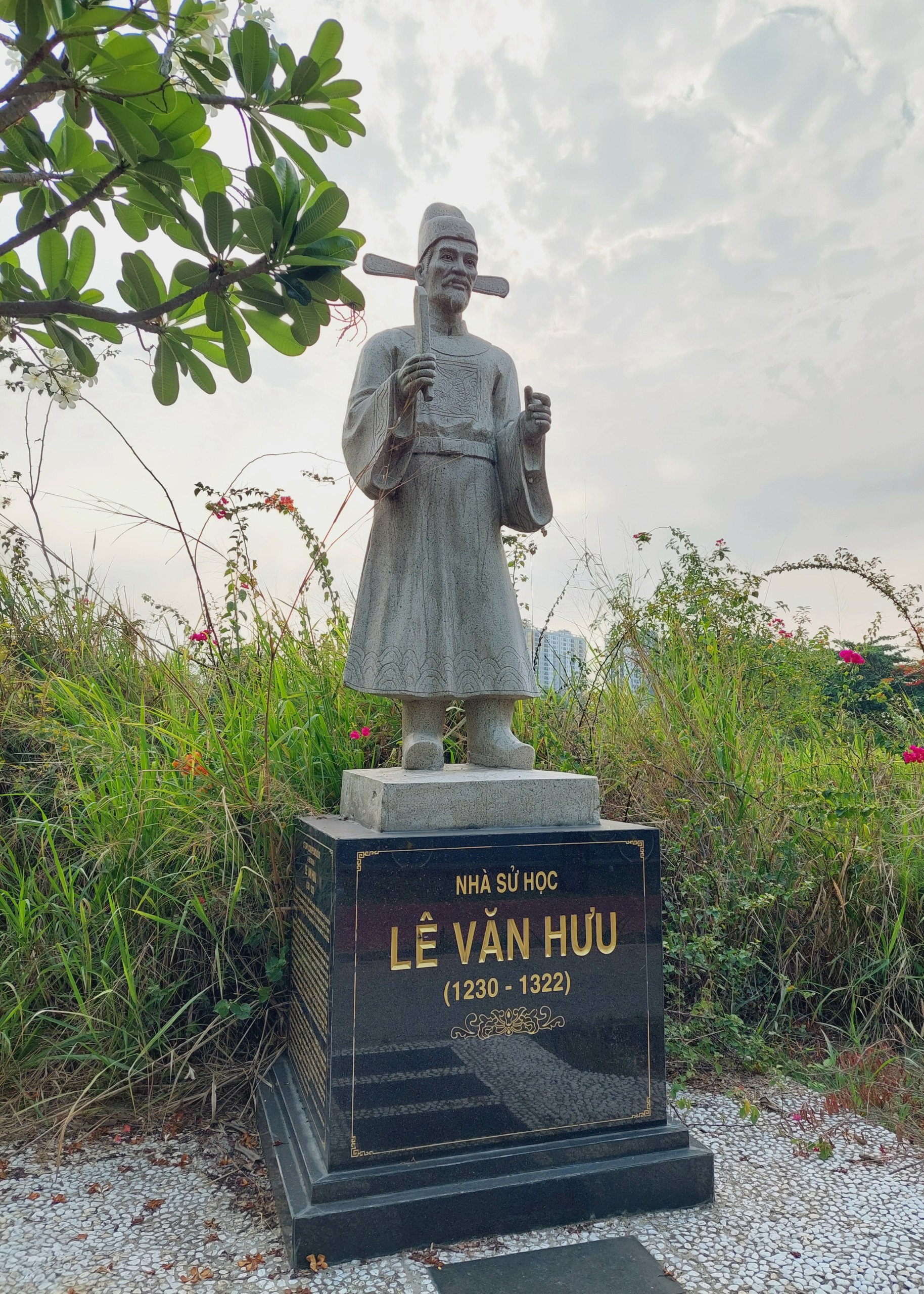
- Statue of Le Van Huu
- Born: 1230; Phủ Lý, Hà Nam, Annam
- Died: 1322 (aged 91–92); Thăng Long, Annam
- Occupation: Royal historian
- Writing career
- Language: Vietnamese, chữ Hán
- Period: Trần dynasty
- Genre: Historiography
- Notable work: Đại Việt sử ký

Lê Văn Hưu (1230–1322) was a historian of the Trần dynasty. He is best known for his work the Đại Việt sử ký, the first comprehensive historical record of the history of Vietnam. Although the book was lost during the Fourth Chinese domination in Vietnam, its contents, including Lê Văn Hưu's comments on various events in the history of Vietnam, were used by other Vietnamese historians as a base for their works, notably the Đại Việt sử ký toàn thư by Ngô Sĩ Liên.

== History ==
Lê Văn Hưu was born in 1230 in Phủ Lý village, Hà Nam now Phủ Lý District, Hà Nam. In February 1247 he ranked second in the Imperial examination organized under the reign of Trần Thái Tông and thus received the title bảng nhãn (榜眼, eyes positioned alongside). After the examination, he was appointed an official of the royal court of the Trần dynasty and was gradually promoted to Hàn Lâm viện học sĩ (翰林院學士, Member of the Hanlin Academy) and Quốc sử viện giám tu (Supervisor of the royal bureau for historical records) during the reign of Trần Thánh Tông. Lê Văn Hưu was also the teacher of the Prince Chiêu Minh Trần Quang Khải, the younger brother of Trần Thánh Tông.

Lê Văn Hưu began to compile the official historical text of the Trần dynasty named Đại Việt sử ký (大越史記, Annals of Đại Việt) during the reign of Trần Thái Tông. In this 30-volume (quyển) text, Lê Văn Hưu comprehensively recounted the history of Vietnam from Triệu Đà, the first king of the Triệu dynasty, to Lý Chiêu Hoàng which was the empress regnant and the last ruler of the Lý dynasty. After the Đại Việt sử ký was finished, Lê Văn Hưu offered the book to the Emperor Trần Thánh Tông in January 1272 and was praised by Thánh Tông for its quality. Lê Tắc in his An Nam chí lược suggested that the Đại Việt sử ký was compiled by Lê Văn Hưu in revising the book Việt chí (越志, Records of Việt) which was written by Trần Phổ under the order of Trần Thái Tông.

According to Từ điển bách khoa toàn thư Việt Nam, Lê Văn Hưu died in 1322 at the age of 92.

== Works ==
Lê Văn Hưu's Đại Việt sử ký is considered the first comprehensive historical record of the history of Vietnam. During the Fourth Chinese domination, many valuable books of Đại Việt were taken away by the Ming dynasty including the Đại Việt sử ký, hence the book was subsequently lost and they could not find out anymore the original version of the Đại Việt sử ký. However, the contents of the Đại Việt sử ký and Lê Văn Hưu's comments on various historical events was collected by Phan Phu Tiên and later Ngô Sĩ Liên in their works, notably the Đại Việt sử ký toàn thư by Ngô Sĩ Liên.

From his remarks recorded in the Đại Việt sử ký toàn thư, Lê Văn Hưu proved to focus his work on Đại Việt's independence from and equality with its northern neighbour China. For example, Lê Văn Hưu praised Ngô Quyền for his original military tactics defeating the Southern Han's navy in the Battle of Bạch Đằng (938) and restoring the independence of Vietnam but he criticized Ngô Quyền's decision of keeping the title King (Vương) instead of self-proclaiming Emperor (Hoàng đế). Lê Văn Hưu was also the first Vietnamese historian who appreciated the revolt of the Trưng Sisters against the Han dynasty which he evaluated a symbol of the fight for independence in Vietnam. Therefore, Lê Văn Hưu was considered an essential scholar in affirming an autonomous identity for Vietnam.
