= Lý Tế Xuyên =

Lý Tế Xuyên (chữ Hán: 李濟川; fl. 1400) was a Vietnamese historian, compiler of the Việt Điện U Linh Tập (Collection of Stories on Spirits of the Departed in the Viet Realm). The text gives not the history of historical figures, but their roles as spirits in the afterlife according to Mahayana Buddhism.
