= Hịch tướng sĩ =

The Exhortation to the Military Generals (Vietnamese: Dụ chư tì tướng hịch văn, chữ Hán: 諭諸裨將檄文) was a document in Classical Chinese written by Trần Quốc Tuấn in 1284, before the invasion of the Trần dynasty by the Yuan dynasty.
