= Ngô Thì Sĩ =

Vietnamese scholar, historian and government official (1726–1780)

Ngô Thì Sĩ 吳時仕
- Born: 1726; Thanh Oai, Đại Việt
- Died: 1780 (aged 53–54); Lạng Sơn, Đại Việt
- Occupation: Royal historian
- Writing career
- Language: Vietnamese, Hán văn
- Period: Revival Lê dynasty
- Genre: Historiography
- Notable works: Việt sử tiêu án, Đại Việt sử ký tiền biên, Đại Việt sử ký tục biên

Ngô Thì Sĩ (吳時仕, 1726–1780) was an 18th-century Vietnamese scholar, historian and government official.

He passed court examination and awarded hoàng giáp in 1766, then served as Hiệu lý Viện Hàn to proofread the national history.

Sĩ is known for being the principal compiler of the Việt sử tiêu án, Đại Việt sử ký tiền biên and Đại Việt sử ký tục biên. He was the first man who regarded Triệu dynasty as a separate regime of China instead of a legitimate dynasty of Vietnam.

Sĩ had four sons: Ngô Thì Nhậm, Ngô Thì Chí, Ngô Thì Trí, Ngô Thì Hương, and a son-in-law Phan Huy Ích. All of them were scholars.
