= Ngô Sĩ Liên =

Vietnamese historian (15th century)

- 吳士連
- Born: Chương Đức commune, Hà Đông rural district, Sơn Nam garrison, Annam
- Died: Đông Đô, Annam
- Occupation: Royal chronicer
- Writing career
- Language: Hán văn
- Period: Later Lê dynasty
- Genre: Historiography
- Notable work: Đại Việt sử ký toàn thư

Ngô Sĩ Liên (吳士連) was a Vietnamese historian of the Lê dynasty.

== Biography ==
Ngô Sĩ Liên was the main compiler of the Đại Việt sử ký toàn thư, a chronicle of the history of Vietnam and a historical record of an Annamese dynasty. Ngô based information for his historical book from collections of myths and legends such as Trần Thế Pháp's Lĩnh Nam chích quái or Việt điện u linh tập.

The exact dates of Ngô Sĩ Liên's birth and death are unknown but it was said that he was born in the Đan Sĩ village, Hà Đông, Hanoi. In his youth, Ngô Sĩ Liên participated in the Lam Sơn uprising of Lê Lợi that led to the retreat of the Ming dynasty and the foundation of the Lê dynasty in Vietnam. In the 1442 imperial examination under the rule of Lê Thái Tông, Ngô Sĩ Liên gained the title Doctorate (Tiến sĩ) and thus became an official in the royal court of three successive emperors Lê Thái Tông (1434–1442), Lê Nhân Tông (1442–1459) and Lê Thánh Tông (1460–1497), during the latter's reign, Ngô Sĩ Liên was appointed Director of the National Bureau for Historical Record (Viện Quốc sử) in 1473. According to some sources, Ngô Sĩ Liên lived up to the age of 99, so he was likely born around 1400 and died during the late period of Lê Thánh Tông's reign.

Ngô Sĩ Liên was born around the time of the Trần dynasty, the subsequent Fourth Chinese domination by the Ming dynasty, the Lam Sơn uprising, the coronation of Lê Lợi and several struggles in the royal family of the Lê dynasty. Besides, Ngô Sĩ Liên also witnessed the gradual predomination of the Confucianism over the Buddhism in the royal court, especially during the reign of Lê Thánh Tông, it was the context in which Ngô Sĩ Liên wrote his Đại Việt sử ký toàn thư.

== Works ==
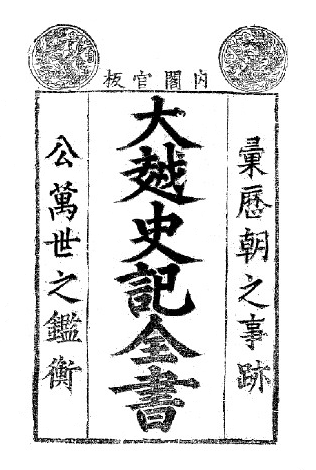
Đại Việt sử ký toàn thư.

Ngô Sĩ Liên's major work is the historical record Đại Việt sử ký toàn thư, a 15-volume (quyển) book that he compiled in revising the Đại Việt sử ký and Đại Việt sử ký tục biên. During the reign of Lê Thánh Tông, the emperor had commissioned his historians to write an official chronicle for the dynasty in the Quang Thuận period (1460–1469). This work was later lost but after Thánh Tông's order, Ngô Sĩ Liên, a member of the board of compilation, wrote his own version in 1479 which was finally resulted in the Đại Việt sử ký toàn thư. The fact that Ngô Sĩ Liên decided to write his own national history despite the existence of the official records might be explained by Ngô's intention of expressing his opinions in the book just as Lê Văn Hưu did with his Đại Việt sử ký instead of satisfying with only an objective narration of the official records. Some reasoned that Ngô Sĩ Liên compiled the Đại Việt sử ký toàn thư because he felt the need to promote Confucian ideology in the Lê dynasty.

Ngô Sĩ Liên's style of compilation was influenced by Sima Guang, the author of the Zizhi Tongjian. Ngô Sĩ Liên not only used official historical documents, but also extracted information from Việt điện u linh tập (Compilation of the potent spirits in the Realm of Việt) and Lĩnh Nam chính quái (Extraordinary stories of Lĩnh Nam), which were collections of folk legends and myths but considered by the historian as having some credibility about history.

Ngô Sĩ Liên also divided the history of Vietnam into two principal periods. He placed all events that happened before the establishment of the Đinh dynasty in the Peripheral Records (Ngoại kỷ) while the independent time from the Đinh dynasty (10th century) to the creation of the Lê dynasty in 1482 was narrated in the Basic Records (Bản kỷ). In addition, Ngô Sĩ Liên also compiled another three records for the reigns of Lê Thái Tổ, Lê Thái Tông and Lê Nhân Tông (1428–1459) in a separate volume named Tam triều bản kỷ (Records of the Three Reigns).

From his 72 comments in Đại Việt sử ký toàn thư, Ngô Sĩ Liên appeared to be a Neo-Confucian scholar. He often quoted Confucian literature in criticizing an event or a decision of the previous dynasties that he believed did not follow the Confucian codes for an appropriate ruling institution. According to O. W. Wolters, Ngô Sĩ Liên respected the Confucian perspective to the extent that the highest praise he could lavish on a Vietnamese ruler (such as those of the Trần dynasty) was that his achievements could not be bettered by even the most famous Chinese emperors in antiquity.

However, Ngô often criticized and made harsh remarks on previous dynasties such as the Lý dynasty. Ngô was concerned about his current dynasty because the Lê dynasty would fall into collapse unless it could avoid the mistakes that were committed by its predecessors like the Lý dynasty.

Ngô may have fabricated the existence of the fictional Hồng Bàng dynasty in the Peripheral Records. Ngô Sĩ Liên's introduction of this dynasty was challenged by several historians for the lack of information and the real motive of the historian in writing about Hùng kings. Some remarked that Ngô Sĩ Liên fabricated the existence of the Hồng Bàng dynasty to serve political interests or because he wanted to emphasize the independence of Vietnam from China.

Today, Đại Việt sử ký toàn thư is an official historical record of a Vietnamese dynasty that remains in its original form.

== Notes and references ==
=== References ===
- National Bureau for Historical Record (1998), Khâm định Việt sử Thông giám cương mục (in Vietnamese), Hanoi: Education Publishing House
- Chapuis, Oscar (1995), A history of Vietnam: from Hong Bang to Tu Duc, Greenwood Publishing Group, ISBN 0-313-29622-7
- Ngô Sĩ Liên (1993), Đại Việt sử ký toàn thư (in Vietnamese) (Nội các quan bản ed.), Hanoi: Social Science Publishing House
- Reid, Anthony; Alilunas-Rodgers, Kristine (2001), Sojourners and settlers: histories of Southeast Asia and the Chinese, University of Hawaii Press, ISBN 0-8248-2446-6
- Taylor, Keith Weller (1991), The Birth of Vietnam, University of California Press, ISBN 0-520-07417-3
- Trần Trọng Kim (1971), Việt Nam sử lược (in Vietnamese), Saigon: Center for School Materials
- Tran, Tuyet Nhung; Reid, Anthony J. S. (2006), Việt Nam Borderless Histories, Madison, Wisconsin: The University of Wisconsin Press, ISBN 978-0-299-21770-9
- Taylor, Keith Weller; Whitmore, John K. (1995), Essays into Vietnamese pasts, Volume 19, SEAP Publications, ISBN 0-87727-718-4
