= Việt Điện U Linh Tập =

1329 history of Vietnam compiled by Lý Tế Xuyên

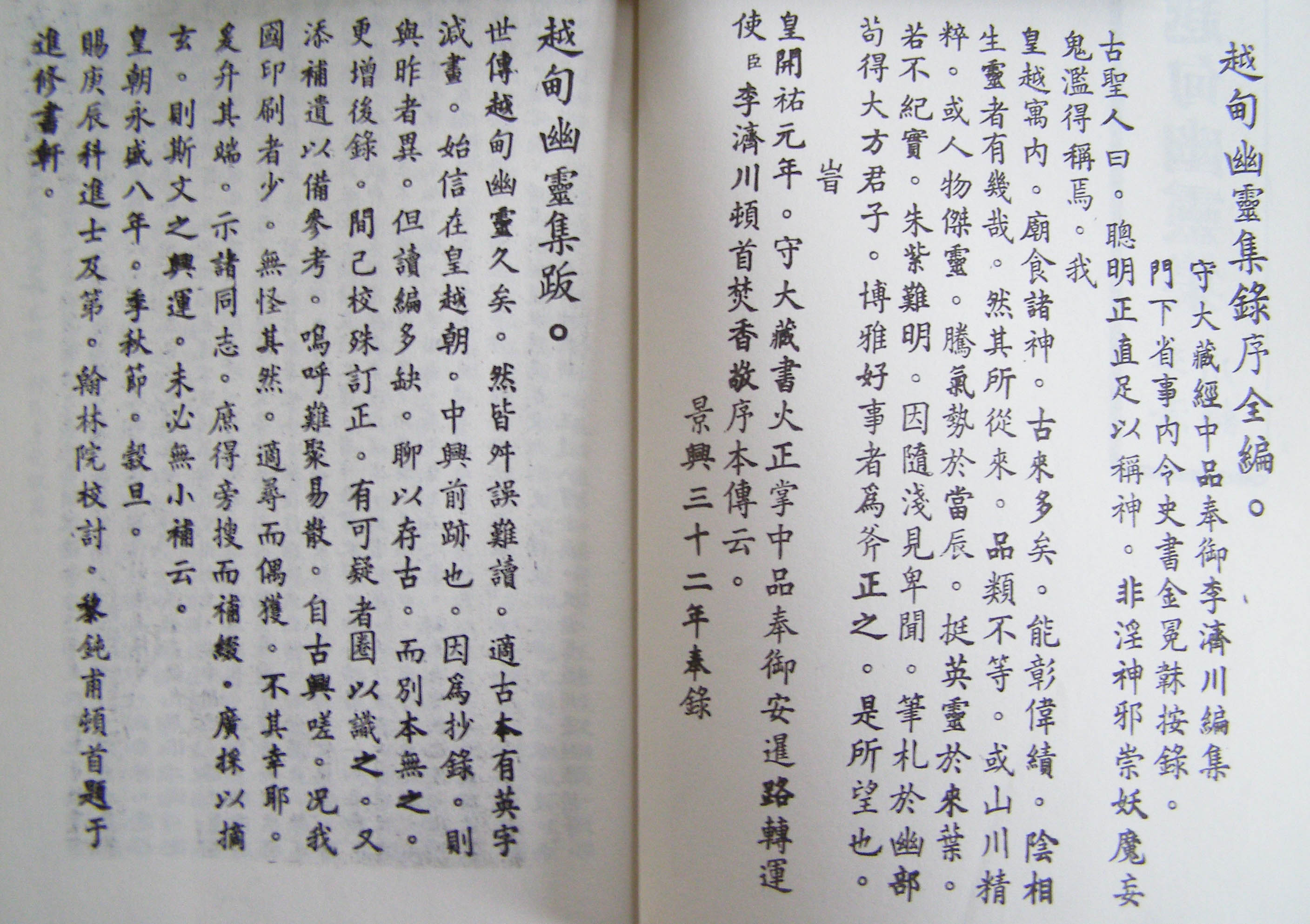
Photo taken from the original, Viet Dien U Linh Tap, Manh Nghi Tran Kinh Hoa, Khai Tri Publishing House, Saigon, 1959

Việt Điện U Linh Tập (chữ Hán: 粵甸幽靈集 or 越甸幽靈集 lit. 'Collection of Stories on the Shady and Spiritual World of the Viet Realm') is a collection of Vietnamese history written in chữ Nho compiled by Lý Tế Xuyên in 1329.

The English "Viet Realm" (or "Yue Territory") derives from alternative Chinese characters designating Vietnam under Chinese rule. Chinese sources tend to use the Chinese title Yuedian (粵甸, Yue as in Nanyue) whereas Vietnamese sources tend to use the title Việt Điện (越甸). The use differs in selection of different chữ Hán characters for Viet/Yue. The text gives not only a commentated history of historical figures, but also their roles as spirits in the afterlife according to the traditions developed in Vietnam's Mahayana Buddhism. The text also cited from contributions of Tang dynasty author Zhao Chang (fl. 791–802) and Zeng Gun (f. 866–897) who ruled the Protectorate General to Pacify the South (northern Vietnam).

== See also ==
- Lĩnh Nam chích quái

== Bibliography ==
- Dror, Olga (2007). Cult, Culture, and Authority: Princess Liễu Hạnh in Vietnamese History. University of Hawaii Press. ISBN 0-824-86207-4.
- Pelley, Patricia M. (2002). Postcolonial Vietnam: New Histories of the National Past. Duke University Press. ISBN 978-0-822-32966-4.
- Dutton, George; Werner, Jayne; Whitmore, John K., eds. (2012). Sources of Vietnamese Tradition. Columbia University Press. ISBN 978-0-231-51110-0.
- Taylor, Keith Weller (1983), The Birth of the Vietnam, University of California Press, ISBN 9780520074170
- Taylor, K. W. (1986), "Authority and Legitimacy in 11th Cen. Vietnam", in Milner, Anthony Crothers; Marr, David G. (eds.), Southeast Asia in the 9th to 14th Centuries, Cambridge: Institute of Southeast Asian Studies, ISBN 978-9-971-98839-5
- Taylor, Philip (2007). Modernity and Re-Enchantment: Religion in Post-Revolutionary Vietnam. Institute of Southeast Asian Studies. ISBN 978-9-812-30438-4.
