= Lĩnh Nam chích quái =

14th-century Vietnamese semi-fictional work

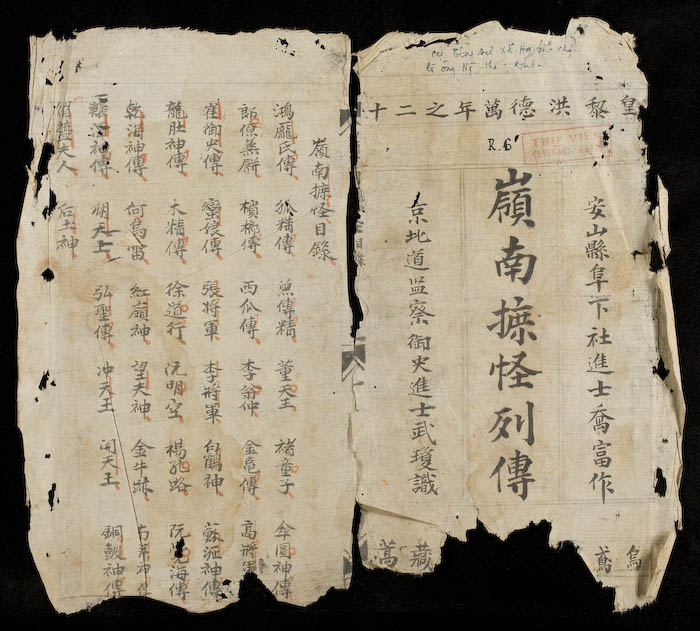
One page

Lĩnh Nam chích quái (chữ Hán: 嶺南摭怪 lit. "Selection of Strange Tales in Lĩnh Nam") is a 14th-century Vietnamese work on folklore written in chữ Hán by Trần Thế Pháp. The title indicates strange tales "plucked from the dust" of the Lingnan region of Southern China and Northern Vietnam.

Later editors who worked on the collection include Vũ Quỳnh (1452–1516) and Kiều Phú (1447–?).

== See also ==
- Việt Điện U Linh Tập
