= Đinh Hạng Lang =

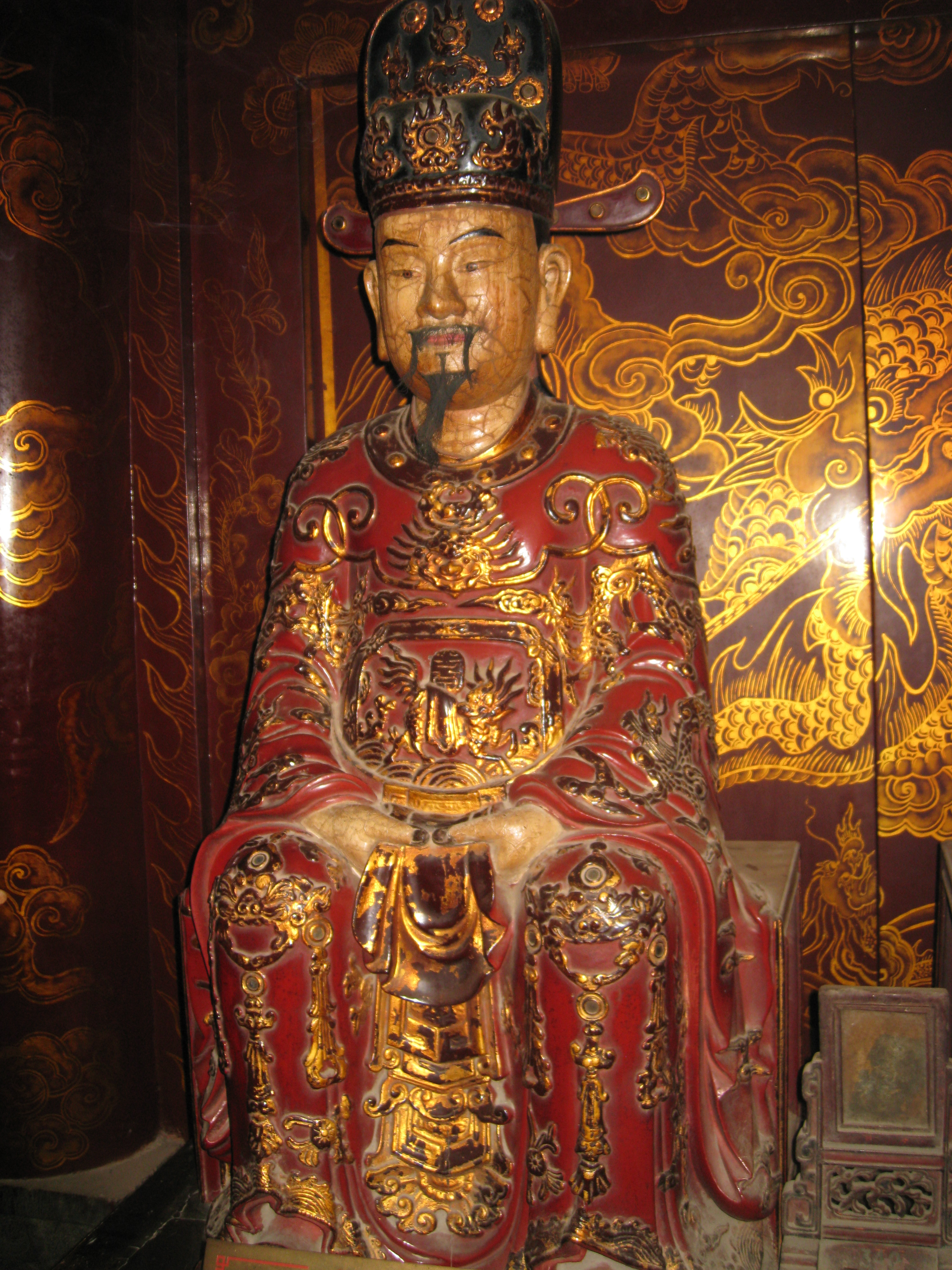
- Fictional portrait statue of Lê period's craftsmans about crown prince Đinh Hạng Lang. The statue in the ancient capital Hoa Lư.
- Born: ? Tràng An, Đại Cồ Việt
- Died: 979; Tràng An, Đại Cồ Việt

Đinh Hạng Lang (chữ Hán: 丁項郎, died 979), dharma name Đính-noa Tăng-noa (頂帑僧帑), was the crown prince of the Đinh dynasty.

== Biography ==
Prince Đinh Hạng Lang was the third and youngest son of emperor Đinh Tiên Hoàng. As emperor Đinh Tiên Hoàng married multiple queens, Prince Đinh Hạng Lang had two older half-brothers: Đinh Liễn and Đinh Toàn. He had a very meek personality, and was cherished by his father.

In 978, emperor Đinh Tiên Hoàng made the controversial decision of designating Hạng Lang as the crown prince, despite oppositions from officials. This designation enraged Đinh Tiên Hoàng's first son Đinh Liễn, who spent his childhood fighting for his father cause during Anarchy of the 12 Warlords. Before that, back when he was a toddler, his enemies held him hostage, and his father attempted to kill him so that their enemies would lose leverage. He previously forgave his father for this, but now he felt that he was wronged by his father again.

In the spring of 979, Đinh Liễn dispatched his subordinates to assassinate his half brother Crown Prince Hạng Lang. This assassination distressed Đinh Tiên Hoàng and his wives, who could not have done anything to stop it.

== Legacy ==
According to professor Hà Văn Tấn, among the archaeological ruins in Hoa Lư, one Buddhist sutra column - which prince Đinh Liễn had commissioned in 973 - was discovered. In 1964 another column was discovered. By 1978, 14 more columns were discovered. On every column the Uṣṇīṣa Vijaya Dhāraṇī Sūtra was carved, followed by prince Đinh Khuông Liễn's prayers, including one for the departed soul of his younger brother Hạng Lang, styled "the Great Virtuous Đính Noa Tăng Noa", whom he had killed.

I am Đinh Khuông Liễn, the Sincerity-Promoting, Compliant, and Transformed Disciple, the Regional Commander of Jinghai Military Circuit, the specially nominated Grand Preceptor of Inspection, Prince of Nam Việt, with a ten-thousand-household fief. For my deceased younger brother, the Great Virtuous Đính Noa Tăng Noa, did not act loyally and filially, did not serve his august father and eldest brother; he also harbored wickedness in his heart, antithetical to love and tolerance. I, the eldest brother, could not be tolerant [any longer]. Therefore, to keep whole and intact the affectional bonds in the family and rectitude in the state, I have the Great Virtuous Đính Noa Tăng Noa killed. The ancients had said: 'Competitors for official posts yield not [to each other]' and 'It's good to strike first'; now it's come to this. Now I pledge to have one hundred sutra columns made as an offering to my deceased younger brother and all people who had died in the past and will die in the future; I pray for their release from litigations and strifes. Firstly, may the Greatly Victorious and Brilliant Emperor forever hold hegemony over the Heaven's South and may his precious throne always be peacefully preserved.

Hà's Vietnamese translation: "Đệ tử là Suy thành Thuận Hóa, Tĩnh Hải quân Tiết độ sứ, đặc tiến Kiểm hiệu Thái sư, thực ấp một vạn hộ, Nam Việt vương Đinh Khuông Liễn, vì vong đệ là Đại đức Đính Noa Tăng Noa không làm điều trung hiếu, không thờ anh và cha, lại có lòng ác, trái với sự yêu thương và khoan dung, anh không thể bỏ qua, nên đã làm tổn hại đến tính mệnh của Đại đức Đính Noa Tăng Noa, để trọn vẹn tình nhà nghĩa nước. Lời người xưa rằng, đã tranh quan thì không nhường, ra tay trước mới là hay, đến nỗi ra tình hình như vậy. Nay nguyện làm 100 cột kinh để cúng cho vong đệ và những hồn ma của người chết trước đây và sau này, cầu cho tất cả giải thoát, không phải tranh giành kiện tụng. Trước hết là chúc cho Đại Thắng Minh hoàng đế, mãi mãi làm chủ trời Nam, giữ yên ngôi báu".

Hà's Sino-Vietnamese transcripion: "Đệ tử Suy thành Thuận Hóa, Tĩnh Hải quân Tiết độ sứ, đặc tiến Kiểm hiệu Thái sư, thực ấp nhất vạn hộ, Nam Việt vương Đinh Khuông Liễn, sở vi vong đệ Đại đức Đính Noa Tăng Noa bất vi trung hiếu phục sự thượng phụ cập trưởng huynh, khước hành ác tâm, vi bội nhược ái khoan dung, huynh hư trước tạo thứ sở dĩ tổn hại Đại đức Đính Noa Tăng Noa tính mệnh, yếu thành gia quốc vĩnh bá môn phong. Cổ ngôn tranh quan bất nhượng vị, tiên hạ thủ vi lương, trí dĩ như tư. Kim nguyện tạo bảo tràng nhất bách tọa, tiến bạt vong đệ cập tiên vong hậu một nhất hạ thoát, miễn cánh chấp tụng. Tiên chúc Đại Thắng Minh hoàng đế, vĩnh bá Thiên Nam, hằng an bảo vị".

— Column 3A

Firstly, may the Greatly Victorious and Brilliant Emperor forever safeguard the Heaven's South, and secondly, may [Khuông Liễn] assist in the imperial endeavors (Tiên chúc Đại Thắng Minh hoàng đế, vĩnh trấn Thiên Nam, thứ vi khuông tá đế đồ).

— Column 3B

Firstly, may the Greatly Victorious and Brilliant Emperor forever safeguard the Heaven's South, and secondly, may Khuông Liễn be permanently and firmly secured in his emoluments and position. (Tiên chúc Đại Thắng Minh hoàng đế, vĩnh trấn Thiên Nam, thứ vi Khuông Liễn hằng kiên lộc vị).

— Column 3C

== See also ==
- Đinh Phế Đế

== Sources ==
- 潘文閣、蘇爾夢主編 (1998). 越南漢喃銘文匯編·第一集北屬時期至李朝. 巴黎、河內: 法國遠東學院、漢喃研究院（1998）. ISBN 2855395658.
- 越史略（《四庫全書·史部》第466冊）. 上海古籍出版社（1987）.
- 吳士連等. 大越史記全書. 陳荊和編校. 東京大學東洋文化硏究所附屬東洋學文獻センター（昭和59－61年）（1984－1986）.
- "Hội Bảo tồn Di sản chữ Nôm─潘清簡等《欽定越史通鑑綱目》".
- 陳重金（即陳仲金） (1992). 越南通史（即《越南史略》）. 戴可來譯. 北京: 商務印書館（1992）. ISBN 7100004543.

Notable families in Early independent Vietnam

Colour note	Khúc	Dương	Ngô	Kiều	Đinh	Lê

Khúc Thừa Dụ
Khúc Hạo
Dương Đình Nghệ	Khúc Thừa Mỹ
Ngô Quyền	Queen Dương	Đinh Công Trứ	Dương Tam Kha	Kiều Công Tiễn
Ngô Xương Ngập	Ngô Xương Văn	Đinh Tiên Hoàng	Dương Vân Nga	Lê Đại Hành	Kiều Công Chuẩn
Ngô Nhật Khánh	Ngô Xương Xí	Đinh Liễn	Đinh Hạng Lang	Đinh Phế Đế	Kiều Công Hãn
Princess Phất Kim	Lê Long Việt	Lê Long Đĩnh	Kiều Thuận

Notes:
- Ngô Sĩ Liên (1993), Đại Việt sử ký toàn thư (in Vietnamese) (Nội các quan bản ed.), Hanoi: Social Science Publishing House
- National Bureau for Historical Record (1998), Khâm định Việt sử Thông giám cương mục (in Vietnamese), Hanoi: Education Publishing House
- Trần Trọng Kim (1971), Việt Nam sử lược (in Vietnamese), Saigon: Center for School Materials
- Chapuis, Oscar (1995), A history of Vietnam: from Hong Bang to Tu Duc, Greenwood Publishing Group, ISBN 0313296227

Family tree of Vietnamese monarchs
