= Lê Long Việt =

Lê Trung Tông 黎中宗
- Emperor of Đại Cồ Việt

Emperor of Đại Cồ Việt
- Reign: 1005 (3 days)
- Predecessor: Lê Đại Hành
- Successor: Lê Ngọa Triều

Emperor of the Early Lê dynasty
- Reign: 1005 (3 days)
- Predecessor: Lê Đại Hành
- Successor: Lê Ngọa Triều
- Born: 983
- Died: 1005 (aged 22); Hoa Lư, Đại Cồ Việt
Names
- Lê Long Việt (黎龍鉞)
Temple name
- Trung Tông (中宗)
- House: Lê
- Father: Lê Đại Hành
- Mother: Concubine Diệu Nữ

Lê Trung Tông (983–1005) was the second emperor under the Early Lê dynasty. He held the throne for only three days in 1005. His reign was considered one of two shortest reigns in Vietnam's history, along with the reign of Dục Đức under the Nguyễn dynasty.

== Biography ==
He was born in 983 to Lê Đại Hành and Concubine Diệu Nữ. His birth name was Lê Long Việt (黎龍鉞). He was one of ten princes of Lê Đại Hành. After the Crown Prince Long Thâu died, he was chosen as Crown Prince.

In 1005, after Lê Đại Hành died, the princes immediately contested over the throne. The conflicts between the royal princes led to a civil war between these princes for eight months, and the nation fell into anarchy. The main war was between the running crown prince and the oldest surviving prince Long Ngân (the second prince in line to the throne after former crown prince Long Thâu). In October 1005, Long Ngân was defeated and quickly fled to Thạch Hà area, but he was captured and killed by locals. This enabled Long Việt to ascend to the throne.

But after just three days, he was killed by an assassin sent by his brother Lê Long Đĩnh, another rival prince. The assassin merely climbed over the wall, crept into the Emperor's chamber and killed him. As a result, Lê Long Đĩnh was the surviving and undisputed claimant to the royal throne.

== Mysterious death ==
Đại Việt sử ký toàn thư The emperor was killed by his younger brother Long Đĩnh in mysterious circumstances after reigning only three days. All the courtiers ran away except for Lý Công Uẩn, who wept and embraced the body of the emperor. Long Đĩnh succeeded the dead emperor.

== Sources ==
- Trấn Bạch Đằng, Lê Vǎn Nǎm, Nguyễn Quang Vinh, Vua Lê Đại Hành (Thành Phố Hồ Chí Minh: Nhà Xuất Bản Trẻ), 1998.
- Trấn Bạch Đằng, Lê Vǎn Nǎm, Nguyễn Đức Hòa, Cờ Lau Vạn Thắng Vủỏng (Thành Phố Hồ Chí Minh: Nhà Xuất Bản Trẻ), 2005.

Preceded by Lê Đại Hành	Emperor of the Lê dynasty 1005 (3 days)	Succeeded by Lê Long Đĩnh

Notable families in Early independent Vietnam

Colour note	Khúc	Dương	Ngô	Kiều	Đinh	Lê

Khúc Thừa Dụ
Khúc Hạo
Dương Đình Nghệ	Khúc Thừa Mỹ
Ngô Quyền	Queen Dương	Đinh Công Trứ	Dương Tam Kha	Kiều Công Tiễn
Ngô Xương Ngập	Ngô Xương Văn	Đinh Tiên Hoàng	Dương Vân Nga	Lê Đại Hành	Kiều Công Chuẩn
Ngô Nhật Khánh	Ngô Xương Xí	Đinh Liễn	Đinh Hạng Lang	Đinh Phế Đế	Kiều Công Hãn
Princess Phất Kim	Lê Long Việt	Lê Long Đĩnh	Kiều Thuận

Notes:
- Ngô Sĩ Liên (1993), Đại Việt sử ký toàn thư (in Vietnamese) (Nội các quan bản ed.), Hanoi: Social Science Publishing House
- National Bureau for Historical Record (1998), Khâm định Việt sử Thông giám cương mục (in Vietnamese), Hanoi: Education Publishing House
- Trần Trọng Kim (1971), Việt Nam sử lược (in Vietnamese), Saigon: Center for School Materials
- Chapuis, Oscar (1995), A history of Vietnam: from Hong Bang to Tu Duc, Greenwood Publishing Group, ISBN 0313296227

Family tree of Vietnamese monarchs
