= Ngô Nhật Khánh =

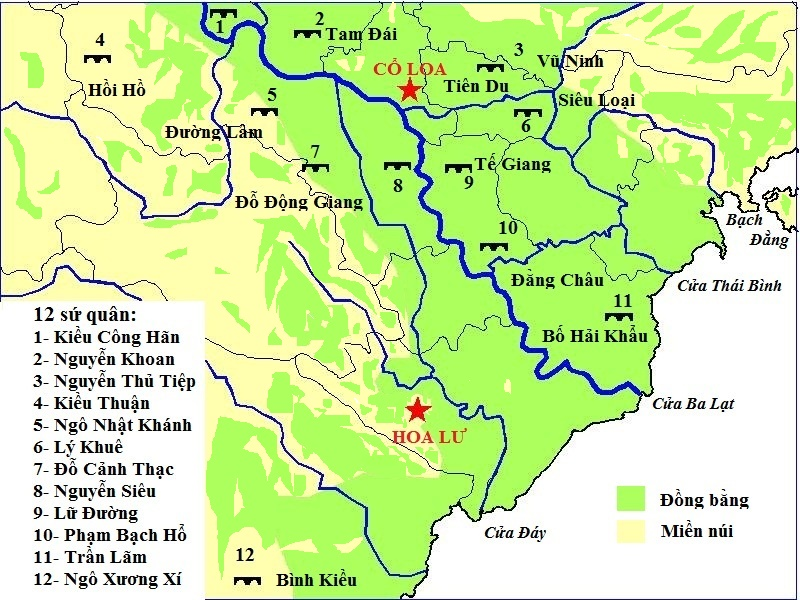
12 Warlords

Ngô Nhật Khánh (chữ Hán: 吳日慶, died 979), formally Prince An (安王), was a Vietnamese warlord during the Period of the 12 Warlords.

Khánh was a grandson of Ngô Quyền. He occupied Đường Lâm (modern Sơn Tây, Hanoi), and titled himself Ngô Lãm Công (吳覽公).

Khánh was defeated by Đinh Bộ Lĩnh in 968. Đinh Bộ Lĩnh married his mother. Khánh also married a daughter of Đinh Bộ Lĩnh, and one of his sisters married Đinh Liễn. But Khánh hated Đinh Bộ Lĩnh intensely. He subsequently took his wife and children and hastened to Champa. Arriving at a seaport on the southern border, he drew a dagger from his waist and slashed his wife’s face, scolding her by saying:

"Your father coerced and ravished my mother and younger sister; how can I, just because of you, forget your father’s cruelty? You go back; I will go a different way to look for those who can help me.” He was exiled in Champa.

In October 979, Đinh Bộ Lĩnh and Đinh Liễn were killed by a eunuch named Đỗ Thích while they were sleeping in the palace courtyard, and the country fell into chaos. After hearing the news, Khánh encouraged Paramesvaravarman I, the king of Champa, to invade Đại Việt. His hope was dashed when a storm destroyed much of the Champa fleet. He fell overboard and drowned.

== Source ==
- Kiernan, Ben (2019). Việt Nam: a history from earliest time to the present. Oxford University Press. ISBN 9780190053796.

Notable families in Early independent Vietnam

| Colour note | Khúc | Dương | Ngô | Kiều | Đinh | Lê |

Khúc Thừa Dụ
Khúc Hạo
Dương Đình Nghệ | Khúc Thừa Mỹ
Ngô Quyền | Queen Dương | Đinh Công Trứ | Dương Tam Kha | Kiều Công Tiễn
Ngô Xương Ngập | Ngô Xương Văn | Đinh Tiên Hoàng | Dương Vân Nga | Lê Đại Hành | Kiều Công Chuẩn
Ngô Nhật Khánh | Ngô Xương Xí | Đinh Liễn | Đinh Hạng Lang | Đinh Phế Đế | Kiều Công Hãn
Princess Phất Kim | Lê Long Việt | Lê Long Đĩnh | Kiều Thuận

Notes:
- Ngô Sĩ Liên (1993), Đại Việt sử ký toàn thư (in Vietnamese) (Nội các quan bản ed.), Hanoi: Social Science Publishing House
- National Bureau for Historical Record (1998), Khâm định Việt sử Thông giám cương mục (in Vietnamese), Hanoi: Education Publishing House
- Trần Trọng Kim (1971), Việt Nam sử lược (in Vietnamese), Saigon: Center for School Materials
- Chapuis, Oscar (1995), A history of Vietnam: from Hong Bang to Tu Duc, Greenwood Publishing Group, ISBN 0313296227

Family tree of Vietnamese monarchs
