= Phạm Cự Lạng =

Vietnamese General

Phạm Cự Lạng (chữ Hán: 范巨倆, 944–984) or Phạm Cự Lượng (范巨量), was a general of Đại Cồ Việt, who served as Grand Commandant during the Đinh dynasty and Early Lê dynasty.

Lạng was born in Trà Hương, Khúc Giang (modern Nam Sách District, Hải Dương Province). His father Phạm Lệnh Công was a general of Ngô Quyền. Lạng led 2,000 men and swore allegiance to Đinh Bộ Lĩnh, and later became an important general of the Đinh dynasty.

Lê Hoàn was made regent in 979, and Lạng became Hoàn's right hand. Song China took note of the weakened condition of Đại Cồ Việt and began to make plans for reconquering the country. Lạng was appointed commander-in-chief to defense. Before the troops set out, Lạng staged a coup, and declared Lê Hoàn the new emperor.
