= Thái Bình Hưng Bảo =

Thái Bình Hưng Bảo (太平興寶) (Note: Although the era name was Thái Bình (太平), all coins actually bear the inscription Đại Bình Hưng Bảo (大平興寶) instead of Thái Bình Hưng Bảo (太平興寶).)
- Đại Cồ Việt (Đinh dynasty)
- Value: 1 cash
- Mass: 2.3 g
- Diameter: 22 to 23.87 mm
- Thickness: 1 mm
- Composition: Bronze
- Years of minting: 970–979

Obverse
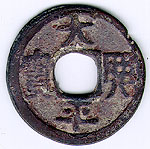
- Design: 大平興寶 (Đại Bình Hưng Bảo)

Reverse
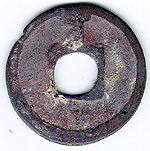
- Design: 丁 (Đinh) (most coins produced under Ðinh Tiên Hoàng and Đinh Phế Đế); Blank (only two scarce varieties tend to have blank reverses)

The Thái Bình Hưng Bảo (chữ Hán: 太平興寶) was the first cash coin produced in Vietnam as well as the oldest currency ever natively produced there. Despite bearing the actual legend of Đại Bình Hưng Bảo (大平興寶) it is known as the "Thái Bình Hưng Bảo" because the era name was "Thái Bình" (太平) as it was first minted in 970 under the reign of Ðinh Tiên Hoàng of the Đinh dynasty, its production ran until 979 under his son, Đinh Phế Đế. The Thái Bình Hưng Bảo was the only coin produced under the Đinh dynasty as even after Ðinh Tiên Hoàng was replaced by his son Đinh Phế Đế, coins the same inscription were continued to be manufactured. The Thái Bình Hưng Bảo helped assert Vietnam's economic, political, diplomatic, and cultural independence from China as up until that point imported Chinese cash coins were the de facto currency of Vietnam for areas that were high in trade. The introduction of a native currency was seen as being culturally significant as it asserted a national consciousness and a continued spirit of independence.

The Thái Bình Hưng Bảo was made of bronze and had a round shape with a square central hole. The round outer shape symbolized the universe, while the square hole represented the earth, as they were perceived in Chinese and Vietnamese mythology. This design continued to be used for Vietnamese cash coins issued by later dynasties and ended with the Bảo Đại Thông Bảo (保大通寶) until Emperor Bảo Đại abdicated in 1945.

== History ==
Prior to the introduction of the Thái Bình Hưng Bảo Vietnam did not have its own currency in circulation as Vietnam was in a chaotic state during the Anarchy of the 12 Warlords where rival factions constantly fought each other, it wasn’t until Vietnam got unified under the Đinh dynasty that there was a central government in place with the authority to issue a national currency, the first Thái Bình Hưng Bảo cash coins had the reverse inscription "丁" (Đinh), which was the name of the dynasty. Numismatists have concluded that this coin was mostly used domestically as Vietnam didn't engage in much maritime trade at the time with the only written record of trade with foreign merchants being in 976 in Hoa Lư along the Hoàng Long river. The presence of contemporary native Vietnamese mints is notably absent in the historical records of Vietnam, however Chinese records confirm that the Đinh dynasty did issue Thái Bình Hưng Bảo coins. Despite issuing its own currency now the Vietnamese economy was still mostly based on barter at the time with Chinese currency mostly circulating in the border area, and although the succeeding Thiên Phúc Trấn Bảo (天福鎮寶) cash coins were more widely produced and circulated more it wasn't until the Later Lê dynasty that the Vietnamese economy became a currency-based economy.

It has been suggested by some Chinese numismatists that cash coins bearing the inscription Thái Bình Hưng Bảo were cast during the first year of the reign of Emperor Lê Hoàn during the Early Lê dynasty.

== Modern influence ==
The State Bank of Vietnam keeps a Thái Bình Hưng Bảo coin in their "traditional room", and a Thái Bình Hưng Bảo coin is also on display at the National Museum of Vietnamese History in Hanoi, as well as in the provincial Museum of Ninh Bình.
