= Lê Thị Phất Ngân =

Lê Thị Phất Ngân 黎氏佛銀

Empress of Đại Cồ Việt
- Born: 980s Hoa Lư, Đại Cồ Việt
- Died: After 1028; Thăng Long?, Đại Cồ Việt
- Spouse: Lý Thái Tổ (Lý Công Uẩn)
- Issue: Lý Thái Tông (Lý Phật Mã); Lý Nhật Quang; Lý Long Bồ
Names
- Empress Lập Giáo (立教皇后); Empress Dowager Linh Hiển (靈顯太后)
- House: Former Lê dynasty (birth); Lý dynasty (marriage)
- Father: Lê Hoàn
- Mother: Dương Vân Nga

Lê Thị Phất Ngân (chữ Hán: 黎氏佛銀, 980s–after 1028) or Lê Phất Ngân (黎佛銀), formally Empress Lập Giáo (立教皇后) from 1016 to 1028 and Empress Dowager Linh Hiển (靈顯太后) afterward, was a princess of the Former Lê dynasty who became an empress of the Lý dynasty. Her father Lê Hoàn, half-brothers Đinh Phế Đế, Lê Trung Tông, Lê Long Đĩnh, husband Lý Thái Tổ and son Lý Thái Tông were all Đại Cồ Việt emperors.
