= Paramesvaravarman I (Champa) =

- Raja-di-raja

King of Champa
- Reign: 972–982
- Coronation: 972
- Predecessor: Jaya Indravarman I
- Successor: unknown
- Born: Unknown; Indrapura, Champa
- Died: 982; Indrapura, Champa
Names
- Unknown
- Father: Jaya Indravarman I

Paramesvaravarman I (Chinese: 波美稅褐印茶; pinyin: Bōměishuìhè Yìnchá; Vietnamese: Phê Mị Thuế), alias Parameśvara Yang Pu Indra (波美稅楊布印茶; Bōměishuì Yáng Bù Yìnchá), was the king of Champa of the Sixth dynasty, ruling from 972 to 982.

Paramesvaravarman showed great punctuality in relations with Song China. He sent no less than seven embassies between 972 and 979. Champa went to conflict with the new independent Vietnamese kingdom of Đại Việt during his reign. In October 979, king Đinh Bộ Lĩnh and prince Đinh Liễn of Dai Viet were killed by a eunuch named Đỗ Thích while they were sleeping in the palace courtyard, and unrest took place in Dai Viet. After hearing the news, Ngô Nhật Khánh, a formal Vietnamese royal dissent exiling in Champa, encouraged Paramesvaravarman, to invade Đại Việt. However ill-fated expedition was scuttled by a typhoon. In the following year, the new ruler of Dai Viet, Lê Hoàn after tempered his kingdom and fended off a Chinese invasion in 981, immediately sent a envoy to Champa. When Paramesvaravarman arrested the envoy Ngô Tử Canh and Từ Mục, that angered Lê Hoàn.

In 982, Lê Hoàn organized a retaliatory expedition to Champa. The Vietnamese army killed Paramesvaravarman, sacked a city in Northern Champa (should be located in Quang Tri), and carried off women from the king's entourage, gold, silver, and other precious objects and even a Buddhist monk from India.

== Bibliography ==
- Coedès, George (1968), Vella, Walter F. (ed.), The Indianized States of Southeast Asia, University of Hawaii Press., ISBN 978-0-8248-0368-1
- Hall, Daniel George Edward (1981), History of South East Asia, Macmillan Education, Limited, ISBN 978-1-349-16521-6
- Kiernan, Ben (2019), Việt Nam: a history from earliest time to the present, Oxford University Press, ISBN 978-0-19005-379-6
- Maspero, Georges (2002), The Champa Kingdom, White Lotus Co., Ltd, ISBN 978-9-747-53499-3

Preceded by Jaya Indravarman I 950–965	King of Champa; 972–982	Succeeded by unknown ?–?
