= Hou Renbao =

- Born: Pingyao, Fenzhou, Song China (modern Pingyao, Jinzhong, Shanxi Province)
- Died: 981; Bạch Đằng River, Đại Cồ Việt

Hou Renbao (simplified Chinese: 侯仁宝; traditional Chinese: 侯仁寶; Vietnamese: Hầu Nhân Bảo, died 981) was a general of the Song dynasty in China.

He was the third son of general Hou Yi (侯益) and married a sister of Zhao Pu. After Zhao's downfall, he was at odds with Zhao's political opponent, Lu Duoxun, and was banished to Yongzhou (邕州, modern Nanning, Guangxi).

At the end of 979, the emperor Đinh Tiên Hoàng and crown prince Đinh Liễn of Đinh dynasty were assassinated. The new emperor Đinh Phế Đế was too young to rule the country, thus general Lê Hoàn was made regent. Nguyễn Bặc launched a rebellion against Hoàn, and the country fell into chaos. Hou sent the message to Emperor Taizong of Song to encourage him to dispatch an army to invade Đại Cồ Việt (modern Vietnam). The suggestion was adopted, and Hou was appointed as admiral to invade Đại Cồ Việt. He was defeated by Lê Hoàn at the Battle of Bạch Đằng River and killed in action.
