= Champa–Đại Cồ Việt war (982) =

Vietnamese military expedition

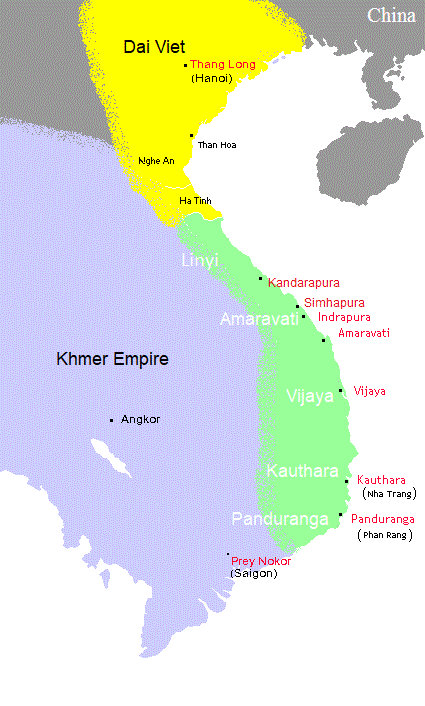
- Champa (green) and ĐạiCồ Việt (yellow) map in 982
Date	982
Location	Central Vietnam
Result	Vietnamese victory

Belligerents
Champa	Đại Việt

Commanders and leaders
Jaya Paramesvaravarman I †	Lê Hoàn

Strength
Unknown	Unknown

Champa–Đại Cồ Việt War of 982 or Cham–Vietnamese War of 982 was a military expedition launched by Vietnamese emperor Lê Hoàn of Đại Việt against emperor Jaya Paramesvaravarman I of Champa in 982. It resulted in the defeat of the Cham forces and the death of Paramesvaravarman I in battle. This marked the beginning of a southward Vietnamese advance against Champa.

== Background ==
Since the end of the 9th century, Vietnamese chieftains and warlords had ruled Northern Vietnam. In 939, Ngô Quyền abolished the military governor, proclaimed himself Emperor, and declared Vietnamese independence from China. However, the Ngô family's reign was short-lived. At the end of the civil war (965-968 AD), Đinh Bộ Lĩnh, the Duke of Hoa Lư, defeated all the warlords and established the kingdom of Đại Cồ Việt (classical Vietnam). During the civil war, Ngô Nhật Khánh, a grandson of Ngô Quyền, was defeated by Đinh Bộ Lĩnh in 967. After the war, the new king Đinh Bộ Lĩnh married his daughter off to Khánh, who subsequently took his new wife and his children to Champa. Upon arriving at a seaport on the southern border, out of his deep hatred for Đinh Bộ Lĩnh, Khánh drew a dagger from his waist and slashed his wife’s face, saying, "Your father coerced and ravished my mother and younger sister; how can I, just because of you, forget your father’s cruelty? You go back; I will go a different way to look for those who can help me." Due to this action, Đại Cồ Việt exiled Khánh to Champa and he was not allowed to return.

In October 979, Emperor Đinh Bộ Lĩnh and Prince Đinh Liễn of Dai Co Viet were killed by a eunuch named Đỗ Thích while they were sleeping in the courtyard of the palace. Their deaths resulted in a state of unrest throughout Dai Viet. After hearing the news, Ngô Nhật Khánh, who was still living out his exile in Champa, encouraged the Cham king Jaya Paramesvaravarman I to invade Đại Việt. The naval invasion was halted due to a typhoon. In the following years, the new Vietnamese ruler, Lê Hoàn, sent emissaries to Champa to announce his accession to the throne. However, Jaya Paramesvaravarman I detained them. As no peaceful reconciliation avail, Lê Hoàn used this action as a pretext for a retaliatory expedition to Champa.

== Course ==
In 982, Lê Hoàn commanded the army and stormed the Cham capital of Indrapura (modern-day Quảng Nam). Jaya Paramesvaravarman I was killed while the invading force sacked Indrapura. They carried off gold, silver, other precious objects, women from the king's entourage, and even an Indian Buddhist monk, before returning to the north. The capital was destroyed, Paramesvaravarman's successor, Jaya Indravarman IV, took refuge in the south while appealing in vain for Chinese help.

...At the time when I was in India, the king of the government of al-Sanf (Note: Champa was known as Sanf in Arabic.) was named "Lajin." The Najrani (Nestorian) monk told me that the current king is known as King Luqin (Note: Luqin was an old Muslim name which referred to Annam, derived from Long Biên.) (Annam), who desired al-Sanf. He devastated it and became ruler over its people.

— Quote of Abu Dulaf in Ibn al-Nadim's Al-Fihrist, 378 H (~987 AD)

== Aftermath ==
In 983, after the war had devastated northern Champa, Lưu Kế Tông, a Vietnamese military officer, took advantage of the disruptions and seized power in Indrapura. In the same year, he successfully resisted Lê Hoàn's attempt to remove him from power. In 986, Indravarman IV died and Lưu Kế Tông proclaimed himself King of Champa. Following the usurpation of Lưu Kế Tông, many Chams and Muslims fled to Song China, particularly the Hainan and Guangzhou regions, to seek refuge. Following the death of Lưu Kế Tông in 989, the native Cham king Jaya Harivarman II was crowned. When the Vietnamese sent Cham prisoners to China, the Chinese sent them back to Champa in 992. The Chams then renewed their attacks against the kingdom of Đại Việt in 995 and 997. In 1000, the Cham finally abandoned Indrapura and moved to the new capital of Vijaya.

== See also ==
- History of the Cham–Vietnamese wars

== Bibliography ==
- Chaffee, John W. (2018), The Muslim Merchants of Premodern China: The History of a Maritime Asian Trade Diaspora, 750-1400, Cambridge University Press, ISBN 978-1-10864-009-1
- Coedès, George (1968), Vella, Walter F. (ed.), The Indianized States of Southeast Asia, University of Hawaii Press., ISBN 978-0-8248-0368-1
- Coedès, George (2015). The Making of South East Asia (RLE Modern East and South East Asia). Taylor & Francis. ISBN 978-1-31745-095-5.
- Elverskog, Johan (2011), Buddhism and Islam on the Silk Road, University of Pennsylvania Press, ISBN 978-0-81220-531-2
- Hall, Daniel George Edward (1981), History of South East Asia, Macmillan Education, Limited, ISBN 978-1-349-16521-6
- Kauz, Ralph (2010), Aspects of the Maritime Silk Road: From the Persian Gulf to the East China Sea, Isd, ISBN 978-3-44706-103-2
- Kiernan, Ben (2019). Việt Nam: a history from earliest time to the present. Oxford University Press. ISBN 978-0-190-05379-6.
- Maspero, Georges (2002), The Champa Kingdom, White Lotus Co., Ltd, ISBN 978-9-74753-499-3
- Walker, Hugh Dyson (2012), East Asia: A New History, ISBN 978-1-47726-516-1
