= Kiều Công Hãn =

Warlord of Vietnam

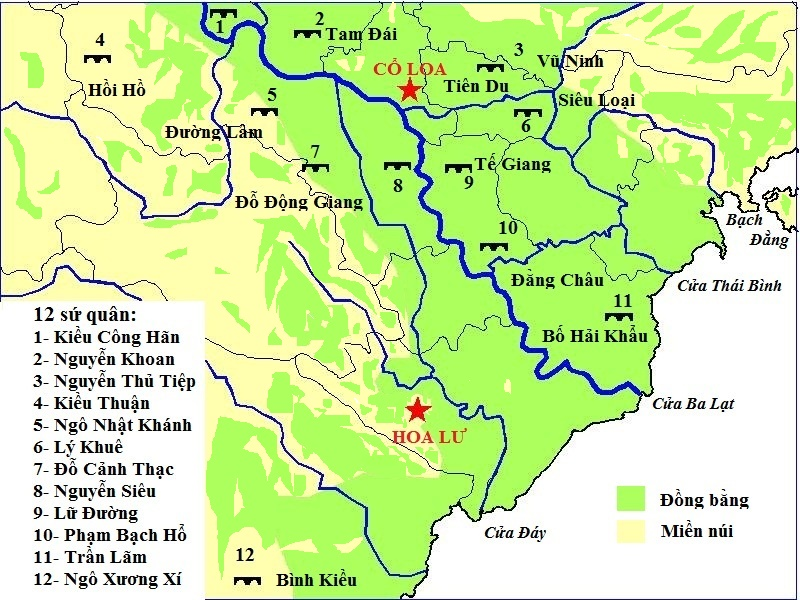
12 Warlords

Kiều Công Hãn (chữ Hán: 矯公罕, died 967) was a warlord of Vietnam during the Period of the 12 Warlords.

Hãn was a grandson of Kiều Công Tiễn. He was also an elder brother of another warlord, Kiều Thuận. He held Phong Châu (modern Việt Trì and Lâm Thao, Phú Thọ Province), and titled himself Kiều Tam Chế (矯三制).

He was defeated by Đinh Bộ Lĩnh in 967.
