= Đinh dynasty =

Vietnamese imperial dynasty from 968 to 980

Đại Cồ Việt Quốc 大瞿越國
- 968–980
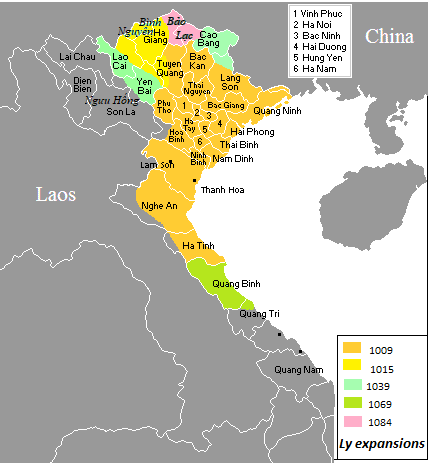
- Đinh dynasty's territory
- Status: Internal imperial system within Song tributary (970–980)
- Capital: Hoa Lư
- Official languages: Literary Chinese (Note: The use of the Classical Chinese language in documents and correspondences is distinct from the use of the Chữ Nôm writing system for the Vietnamese language.) (written)
- Common languages: Old Vietnamese
- Religion: Vietnamese folk religion Buddhism; Taoism
- Government: Monarchy
- Emperor
  - 968–979: Đinh Bộ Lĩnh (first)
  - 979–980: Đinh Phế Đế (last)
- Chancellor
  - 968–979: Duke of Định
- History
  - Anarchy of the 12 Warlords: 965–968
  - Đinh Bộ Lĩnh ends the Anarchy of the 12 Warlords and establishes dynasty: 968
  - Đinh Bộ Lĩnh and Đinh Liễn assassinated: 979
  - General Lê Hoàn succeeded the throne: 980
- Currency: Copper-alloy cash coins (Thái Bình Hưng Bảo)
Preceded by	Succeeded by
Anarchy of the 12 Warlords	Anterior Lê dynasty
- Today part of: Vietnam; China

Đinh
- Country: Đại Cồ Việt (Vietnam)
- Founded: 9th century
- Founder: Đinh Bộ Lĩnh
- Final ruler: Đinh Phế Đế
- Titles: Emperor of Đại Cồ Việt/King of Đại Cồ Việt; King of Giao Chỉ
- Estate: Hoa Lư

The Đinh dynasty (Vietnamese: triều Đinh; Chữ Hán: 朝丁; or Vietnamese: Nhà Đinh; Chữ Nôm: 茹丁, Chinese characters: 丁朝), officially Đại Cồ Việt (Chữ Hán: 大瞿越), was a Vietnamese dynasty. It was founded in 968 when Đinh Bộ Lĩnh vanquished the upheavals of Twelve warlords and ended when the son of Đinh Bộ Lĩnh, Đinh Toàn, ceded the throne to Lê Hoàn in 980.

== Family history ==
=== Origin and rise to power ===
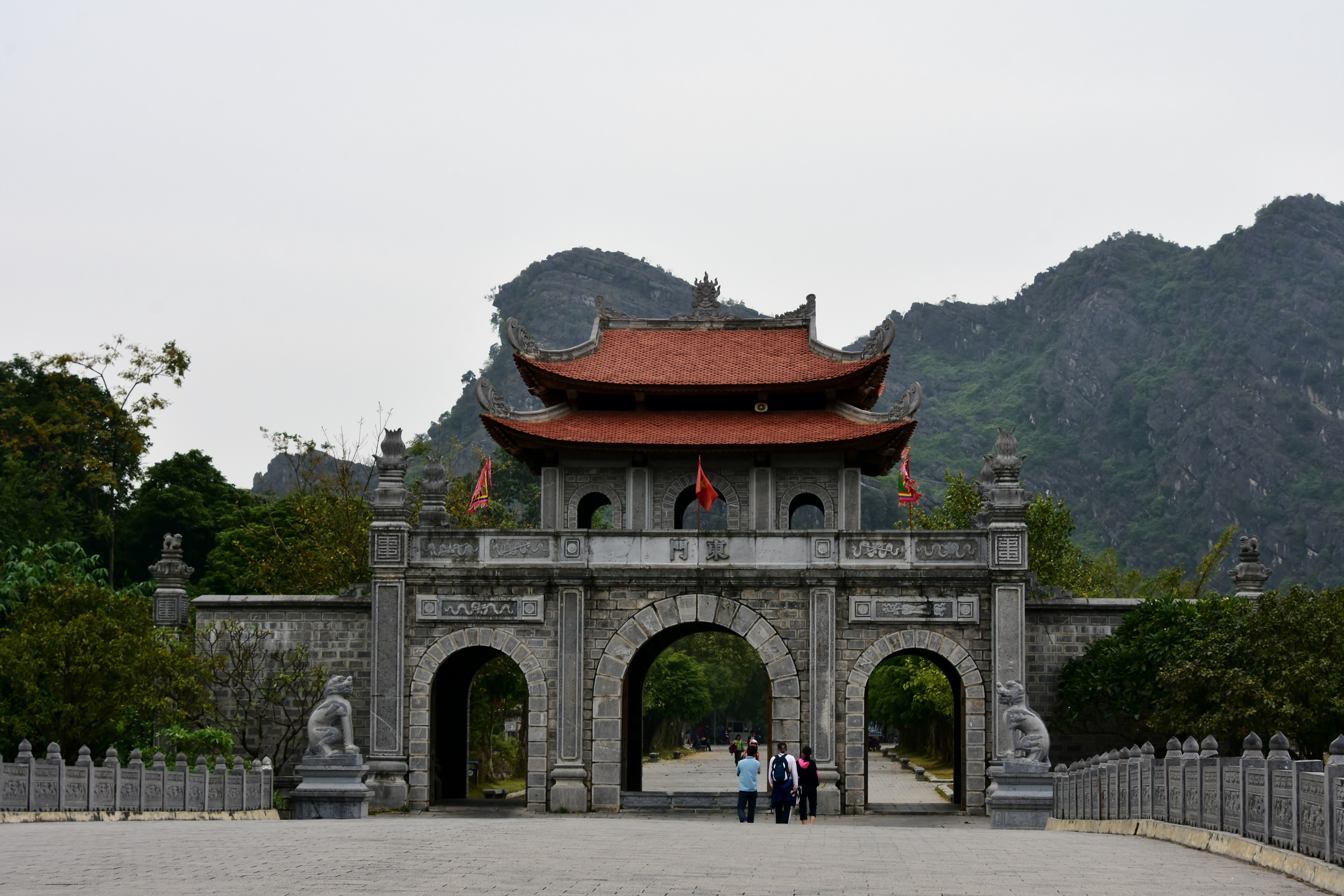
Hoa Lư, Ninh Bình

The Đinh family originated from the village of Hoa Lư, Jinghai kingdom in modern-day Ninh Bình province, northern Vietnam. Đinh Bộ Lĩnh's father, Đinh Công Trứ had served both Dương Đình Nghệ and Ngô Quyền as governor of Hoan Châu (modern-day the city of Vinh). According to Chinese accounts, Bộ Lĩnh succeed his father as Duke of Hoan. His father died when he was a child and he lived with his mother and other family members in a temple near a mountain in Hoa Lư. Đinh Bộ Lĩnh had a sister named Đinh Quế Hương.

Map of division of twelve warlord before the unification

Around 940s, the young Đinh Bộ Lĩnh emerged as a leader of villages youth, who played “royal games” in which Bộ Lĩnh was the king. The tradition folk said he had them collect wood for his mother, who slaughtered a pig and put on a feast. Villagers sensed a grim future leader: “We’d better follow him now before it is too late.” They delivered their youths to Bộ Lĩnh, and he set up a base on the land of his uncle, who refused to submit to him. Bộ Lĩnh sent his friends to attack the uncle, who pursued him, found him trapped under a collapsed bridge, and almost intended to kill him, but then saw two yellow dragons flying above. The uncle withdrew and later submitted to him. Historian Oliver W. Wolters termed the story as a "man of prowess" possessing the “soul stuff” befitting a chief.

In 951, he began challenging the royal authority of the ruling Ngô family. Two king Ngô Xương Ngập and Ngô Xương Văn sent a force tried suppressing Bộ Lĩnh that failed but captured Đinh Bộ Lĩnh's son, Đinh Liễn as a hostage. The two kings suspended Lien from a pole in plain view of Bộ Lĩnh and shouted that he would be killed unless Bộ Lĩnh submitted. Bộ Lĩnh angrily replied, "How can a great man compromise a great affair simply because of his son?" Bộ Lĩnh ordered more than ten arrows shot in Liễn's direction. The two kings were horrified and withdrew their troops.

After Đinh Liễn was able to escaped and returned to Hoa Lư, Đinh Bộ Lĩnh went to convinced Trần Lãm, another warlord who occupied Bố Hải Khẩu (modern-day Thái Bình province) as his ally. When king Ngô Xương Văn was killed during a battle in 965 and the country fells into chaotic civil wars between warlords, Đinh Bộ Lĩnh and Đinh Liễn commanded their army subdued the highland tribes, then took capital Cổ Loa in the same year. Two years later, he defeated or had all the warlords submitted, pacified the country at the age of 43. In 967, Bộ Lĩnh assigned his son Liễn the title "King of Nam Viet". The only survivor of the previous Ngô family, Ngô Nhật Khánh submitted to Bộ Lĩnh, and he gave one of his own daughters, Princess Phất Kim in marriage with Nhật Khánh. After that, Ngô Nhật Khánh took his wife and fled to the south. He scolded her face and hatred of her father, and he went exiled in Champa.

=== Ruling period ===
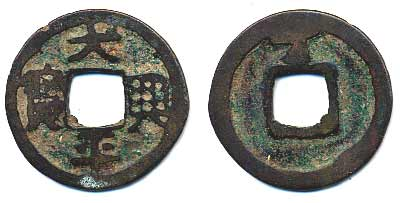
Thái Bình hưng bảo, the first Vietnamese native coins, made of copper

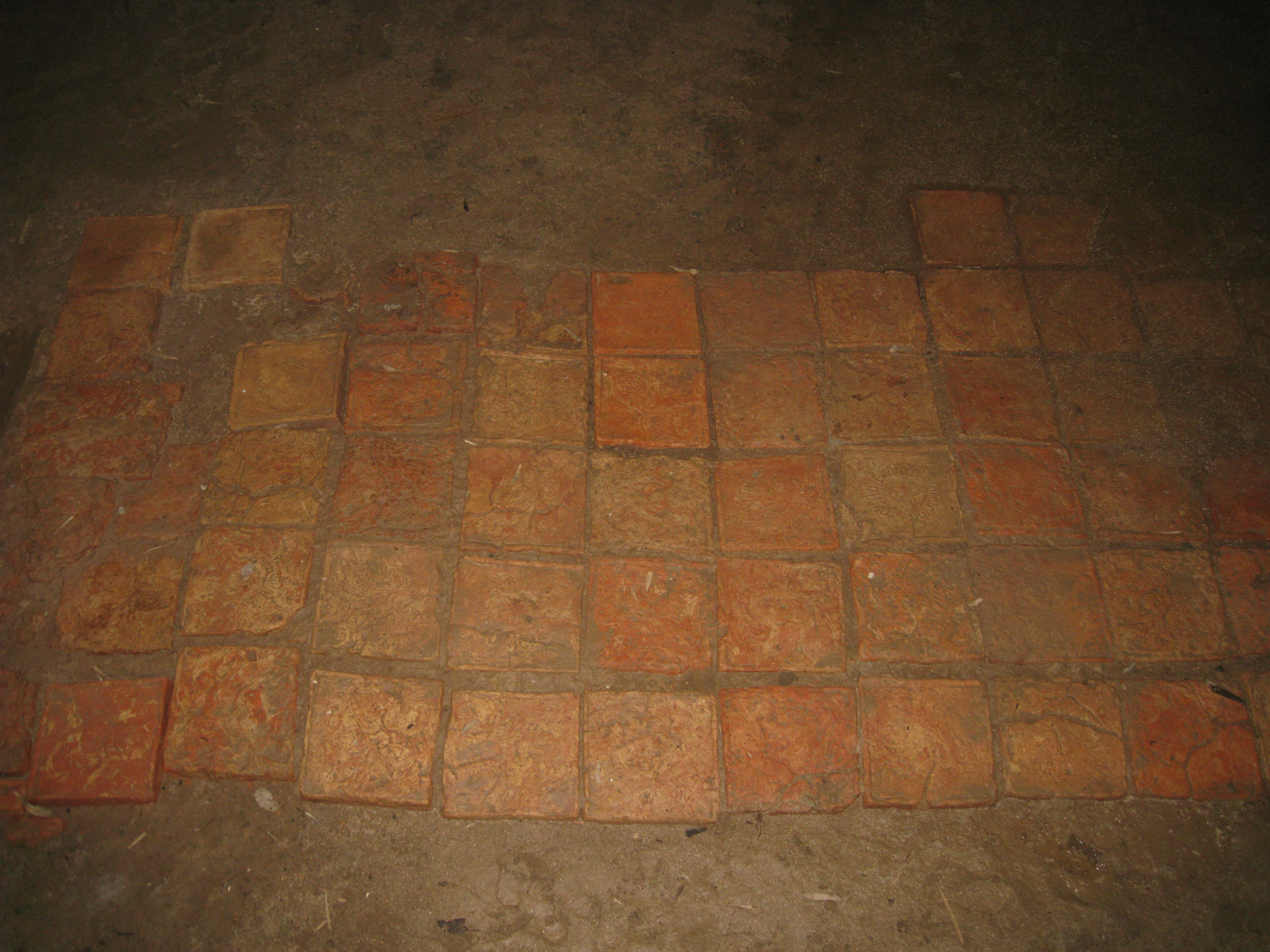
Underground ruins of the Hoa Lư royal palace.

In 968, Đinh Bộ Lĩnh established the kingdom of Đại Cồ Việt, relocated the capital to his home in Hoa Lư. At first he styled himself as Vạn Thắng Vương (Great Vanquishing King), then proclaimed the title emperor. In 970 Đinh Bộ Lĩnh made his reign era Thái Bình (chữ Hán: 太平), issued the coin mining and started the tradition of Vietnamese cash coins. Đinh Bộ Lĩnh established 5 queens. In 971, Đinh Bộ Lĩnh officially published his appointments to the chief court positions. Nguyễn Bặc was placed at the head of the nobility, with the title "Nation Establishing Duke" (Định Quốc Công). Lê Hoàn, a 35-year-old military officer from Ái (Thanh Hoá) was appointed as the commander of the royal army.

The Đinh family established the official religious organization in incorporating Taoists and Buddhists in an administrative hierarchy. Bộ Lĩnh awarded additional titles such as "Buddhist Priest Overseer" to Đại Việt's ranking monks, and in 971 assigned Buddhism's top position, that of great preceptor (đại sư) for reforming the Việt (khuông Việt), to the patriarch of the Vô Ngôn Thông sect, Ngô Chân Lưu, who occupied the post until his death forty years later. Another Buddhist priest, Trương Ma-ni and a Taoist priest, Đặng Huyền Quang were given the title "Buddhist Priest Overseer" (Tăng lực đạo sĩ) and "Noble and Upright Majesty". Đinh Bộ Lĩnh also established shrines to the gods of earth and agriculture. In 973, Prince Đinh Liễn erected one hundred ratanadhvaja stone columns contain Uṣṇīṣa Vijaya Dhāraṇī sutras (written in Classical Chinese) in order to generate merits to help liberate the spirit of his deceased brother. Liễn established another hundred tantric pillars in 979, aiming to gain a healthy perpetuation of the kingdom. Archaeological efforts from 1963 to 1987 have recovered 20 of those stone pillars.

In 972 Đinh Bộ Lĩnh sent tribute envoys include cloth, rhinoceros horns, elephant tusks and perfumed tea to the Song dynasty of China. The Song responded by sending an embassy to Dai Viet and awarding the title "King of Jiaozhi Prefecture" to Bộ Lĩnh; that title was given to Vietnamese monarchs by the Song emperors until 1174.

=== Assassination and dynasty transition ===
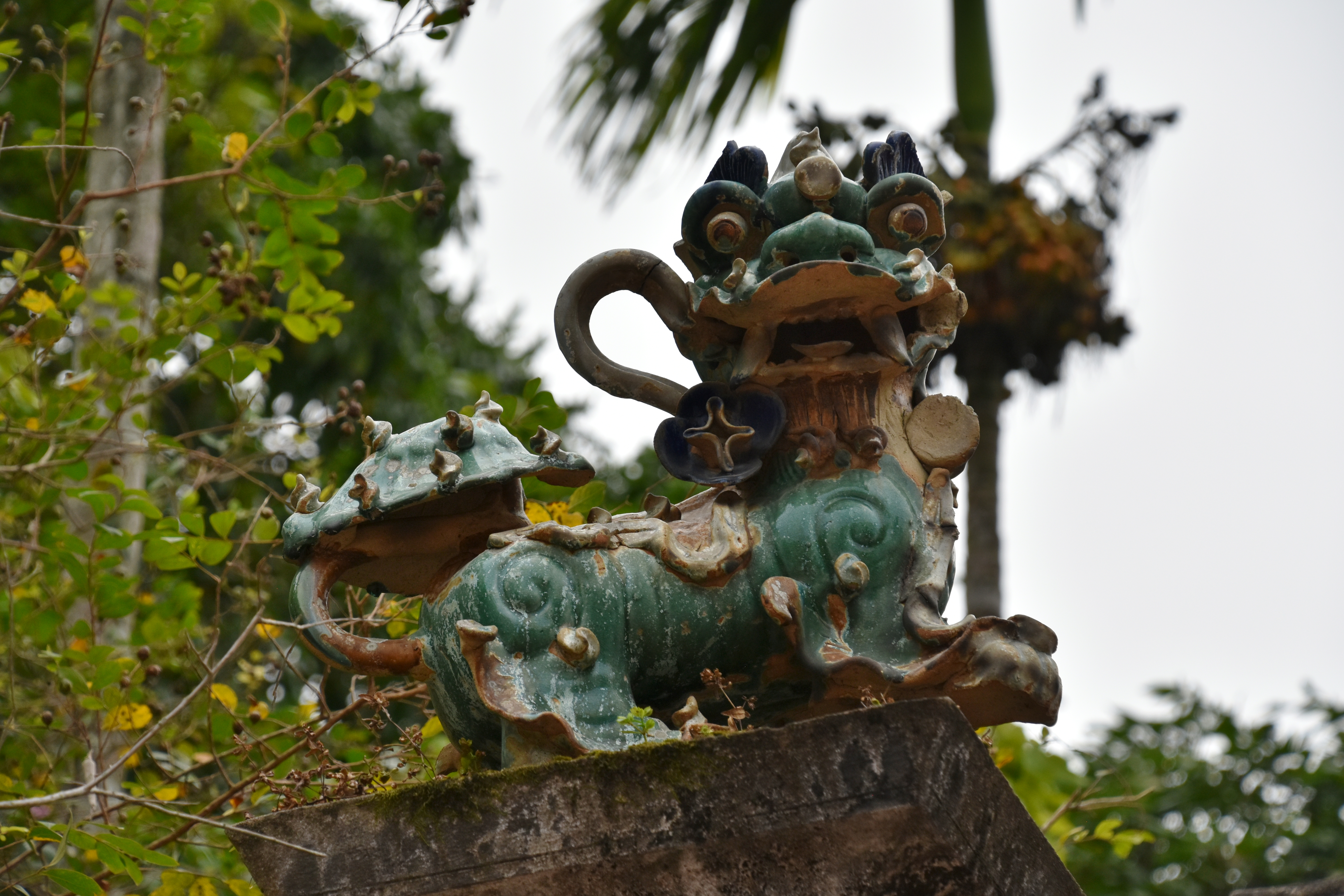
Lion statue in Đinh Tiên Hoàng's temple

In October 979, a eunuch named Đỗ Thích killed the emperor Đinh Bộ Lĩnh and prince Đinh Liễn while they were sleeping in the palace at night. The general Lê Hoàn took power as regent while five-year-old Đinh Toàn occupied the throne. Rebellions erupted. At this juncture, the Song sent troops under Hou Renbao in attempt to restore the throne of the young prince. However, the threat of renewed Chinese intervention in Vietnam caused court officials to support Lê Hoàn's bid for power. They urged him to become king and establish a more stable government, prepare for the Chinese invasion. In 980, officials and generals gathered at Hoa Lư and empress Dương Vân Nga brought out the emperor's robe to put on Lê Hoàn, offered him the throne, and subsequently ended the rule of the Đinh dynasty and transferred power to the Lê family.

=== Descendants ===
After 980, Đinh Bộ Lĩnh's deposed son Đinh Toàn still held a position in the military. However, in 1001 a rebellion erupted in Phong (modern-day Phú Thọ province), Mường rebels trapped the royal army on the Đà River, and Đinh Toàn was killed on his boat.

== Foreign relations ==
From 970 to 975, Đinh Bộ Lĩnh established the status of Đại Việt as a protectorate and tributary state of the Song dynasty to gain Chinese recognition of the independence of Đại Việt. The tributary relationship would last until the French protectorate was established in 1883.

== Legacy ==
The Đinh clan was the first fully independent Vietnamese dynasty. These early Vietnamese warrior-monarchs of Hoa Lư endorsed Vietnamese Buddhism as monks made themselves indispensable to the royal family.

== Family tree ==
Family tree of the Đinh dynasty

Đinh Công Trứ b.877-d.940	Dương Tam Kha d.980
Đinh Quế Hương	Đinh Bộ Lĩnh b.924–d.979 Tiên Hoàng r.968－979	Queen Dương d.1000
Đinh Liễn b.940-d.979 Nam Việt vương	Đinh Toàn b.974-d.1001 Phế Đế r.979－980	Đinh Hạng Lang d.979	Princess Phất Kim d.980

== Sources ==
- Taylor, Keith Weller (1983), The Birth of the Vietnam, University of California Press, ISBN 9780520074170
- Chapuis, Oscar (1995). A history of Vietnam: from Hong Bang to Tu Duc. Greenwood Publishing Group. ISBN 0-313-29622-7.
- Kiernan, Ben (2019). Việt Nam: a history from earliest time to the present. Oxford University Press. ISBN 9780190053796.
- Thich, Quang Minh (2007). Vietnamese Buddhism in America. United States of America: The Florida State University.
- Anderson, James A. (2011), ""Slipping through hole": The Late Tenth- and Early Eleventh-Century Sino-Vietnamese Coastal Frontier as a Subaltern Trade Network", in Li, Tana; Anderson, James A. (eds.), The Tongking Gulf Through History, Pennsylvania: University of Pennsylvania Press, pp. 87–100, ISBN 978-0-812-20502-2
- Tarling, Nicholas (1999). The Cambridge History of Southeast Asia. Cambridge University Press. ISBN 978-0521663724.
- Taylor, K. W. (2013), A History of the Vietnamese, Cambridge University Press, ISBN 978-0-521-87586-8
- Hall, Daniel George Edward (1981), History of South East Asia, Macmillan Education, Limited, ISBN 978-1-349-16521-6

Preceded by Anarchy of the 12 Warlords	Dynasty of Vietnam; 968–980	Succeeded by Early Lê dynasty
