= Lê Long Đĩnh =

Emperor of Đại Cồ Việt

Lê Long Đĩnh 黎龍鋌
- Emperor of Đại Cồ Việt
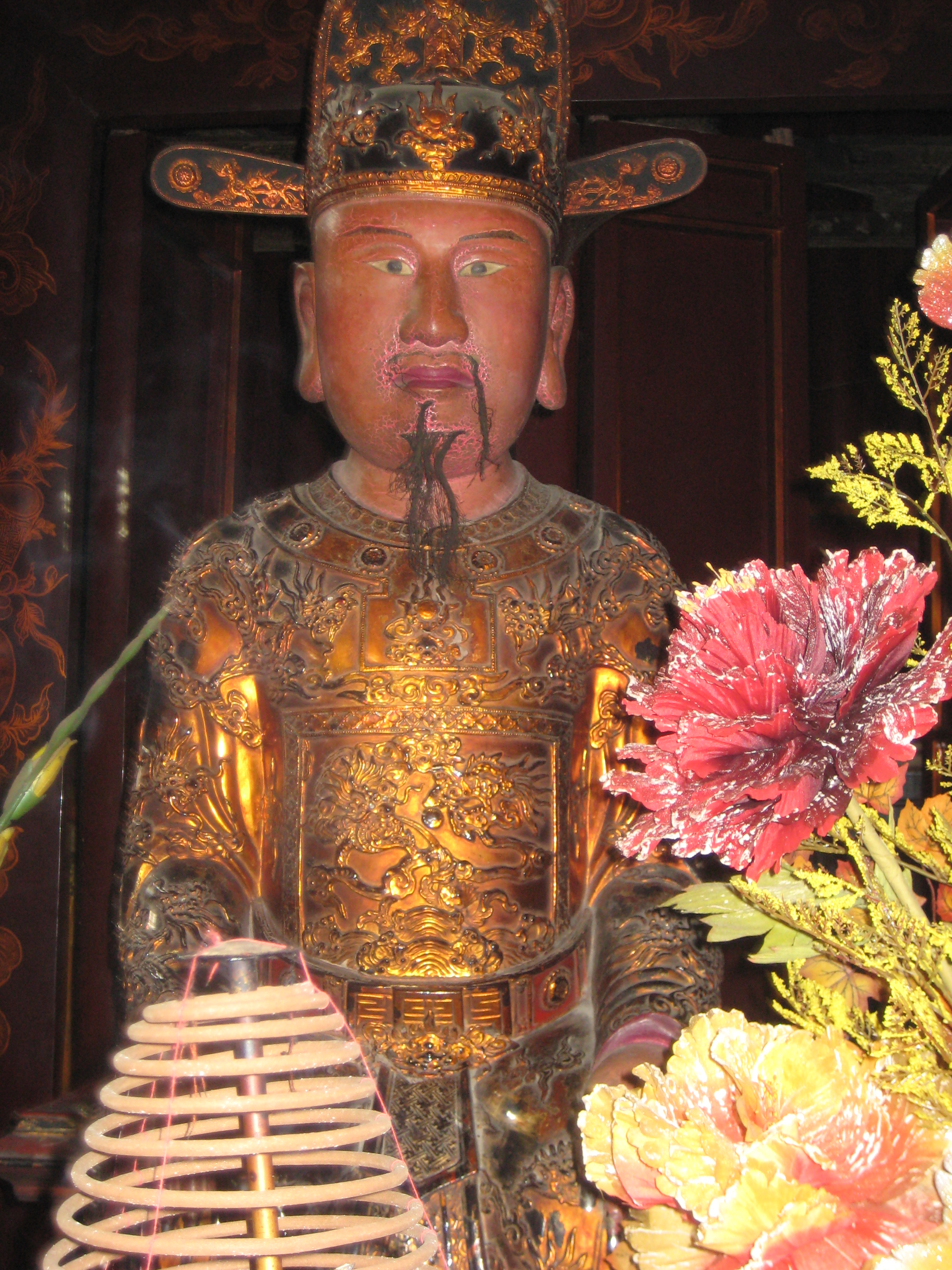
- A statue of Lê Long Đĩnh in Hoa Lư

Emperor of Đại Cồ Việt
- Reign: 1005–1009
- Predecessor: Lê Long Việt
- Successor: Lý Thái Tổ of Later Lý Dynasty

Emperor of Early Lê dynasty
- Reign: 1005–1009
- Predecessor: Lê Long Việt
- Successor: dynasty abolished
- Born: 15 November 986; Hoa Lư, Đại Cồ Việt
- Died: 19 November 1009 (aged 23); Hoa Lư, Đại Cồ Việt
Names
- Lê Long Đĩnh (黎龍鋌)
Era dates
- Ứng Thiên (應天); Cảnh Thụy (景瑞)
Regnal name
- Khai Thiên Ứng Vận Thánh Văn Thần Vũ Tắc Thiên Sùng Đạo Đại Thắng Minh Quang Hiếu Hoàng Đế (開天應運聖文神武則天崇道大勝明光孝皇帝)
Posthumous name
- Ngọa Triều Hoàng Đế (臥朝皇帝) called by Lý Công Uẩn
- House: Lê
- Father: Lê Đại Hành
- Mother: Diệu Nữ
- Religion: Buddhism

Lê Long Đĩnh ([le lawŋm ɗǐŋ̟ˀ]; 黎龍鋌, 15 November 986 – 19 November 1009), also known as Lê Ngọa Triều (黎臥朝), was the last emperor of the Early Lê dynasty of the kingdom of Đại Cồ Việt, ruling from 1005 to 1009. After killing his predecessor and brother Lê Long Việt, he took the throne and named his era Cảnh Thụy. His death at the age of 23 (Note: 24 by East Asian age reckoning) led to the fall of the Early Lê dynasty, and power was seized by the Lý dynasty. In some history books, he is portrayed as a self-indulgent and cruel emperor. However, a lot of temples were created where people still worship him, and recently, some historians have proved that some rumours about his ruling style were exaggerated, and possibly fabrications.

== Background ==
Lê Long Đĩnh, who was also named Lê Chí Trung (黎至忠), was born on 15 November 986 by the Western calendar. He was the fifth son of Emperor Lê Hoàn, but historians do not note the background of his mother, only information regarding a concubine. He was the half-brother of the duke of Nam Phong (Nam Phong vương), Lê Long Việt.

The Complete Annals of Đại Việt (Đại Việt sử ký toàn thư) recorded that in 992 he was granted the title Prince of Khai Minh (Khai Minh Vương, 開明王) and ruled over Đằng county (now Hưng Yên province). In 1004 the crown prince and duke of Kinh Thiên, Lê Long Khâu, died; the emperor made Lê Long Việt the crown prince of Đại Cồ Việt and Lê Long Đĩnh the duke of Khai Minh.

== Struggle for the throne ==
In 1005, Lê Hoàn died in Trường Xuân palace. Crown Prince Lê Long Việt contested the crown with his three brothers: Tích, Kính, and Đĩnh. The four princes pitted their armies against each other, plunging the country into civil war. In October 1005, Việt defeated Tích, forcing him to flee to Champa where he was subsequently killed by locals at the Cơ La estuary. The victorious Việt was proclaimed emperor with the title Trung Tông hoàng đế ('Emperor Trung Tông').

Three days after his ascension, however, Trung Tông was murdered by assassins in Lê Long Đĩnh's employ. All of his supporters fled except for Lý Công Uẩn, who embraced the body of the emperor and wept. In the winter of 1005, Lê Long Đĩnh took the throne with the regnal name Khai Thiên Ứng Vận Thánh Văn Thần Vũ Tắc Thiên Sùng Đạo Đại Thắng Minh Quang Hiếu Hoàng đế (開天應運聖文神武則天崇道大勝明光孝皇帝) and gave his mother the title Hưng Quốc Quảng Thánh Hoàng Thái Hậu (興國廣聖皇太后).

== Reign ==
=== Foreign relations ===
After news of the death of Emperor Lê Hoàn in China, Song dynasty officials urged the Song emperor Taizong to dispatch forces to invade Đại Cồ Việt. However, Taizong chose to respect the tributary status that Đại Cồ Việt had towards the Song Empire, and he left the country alone. Some trading activities occurred between both nations.

=== Sponsorship of Buddhism and education ===
In spring 1007, Lê Long Đĩnh ordered his brother to gift a white pangolin (or white rhinoceros) as a gift to the Song dynasty in exchange for Buddhist sutras to be sent to Vietnam. In the Vietnamese Buddhist records of Zen Buddhist Thích Mật Thể, in the 14th year of the Ứng Thiên era (1008), Lê Long Đĩnh sent an envoy to Song to pay tribute and asked for nine classic texts and sutras to take back to Vietnam. The Song emperor approved the request and gave the requested works to the Vietnamese ambassador. The nine classics included I Ching, Classic of Poetry, Book of Documents, Book of Rites, Spring and Autumn Annals, Classic of Filial Piety, Analects, and Mencius. These were the first classics of Chinese civilization to come to Vietnam.

== Controversies ==
According to the Complete Annals of Đại Việt, Lê Long Đĩnh stands out as a brutal and sadistic ruler. His reign was considered as a "reign of terror" at that time.

The Abridged Chronicles of Viet recorded that the emperor was "bloodthirsty". Whenever someone was to be executed, he would order thatch grass to be wrapped around his body and set on fire, leaving him to burn to death. Or he would entertain by ordering the Song Chinese court jester Liêu Thủ Tâm (廖守心) to slowly mutilate victims using dull swords and axes so that they don't die quickly. When the victims cried out in agony, Thủ Tâm would remark: "This one is not used to death". The emperor was said to have enjoyed this joke. Every time there was a court session, he ordered jesters and performers to sing and talk nonsense to cover up the words of whoever reporting.

After capturing prisoners of war, Long Dĩnh purportedly ordered to escort them to the riverbank where they were put in cages. When the high tide rose, he would watch them drown slowly. The emperor is said to stab animals such as pigs or cows to death before allowing servants to bring them to the kitchen. At one night, he have cats killed and served to the guests. After eating, the emperor displayed the cats' heads, and all the princes vomited. Another time, the king would put a sugarcane stick on the head of the Supreme Monk Quách Mão, then pretend to accidentally swinging his knife to make a cut on Quách Mão's forehead and laugh it off.

== Later life ==
According to historical records, he developed hemorrhoids and often held court while lying down, earning the popular name Lê Ngọa Triều (ngọa means 'lie' and triều means 'court'). He was not given a temple name because his successor ended the Early Lê dynasty and started the Lý dynasty.

He held the throne for four years, until 1009, when he died at the age of 23. His son Sạ was a child at the time, under the supervision of an official named Đào Cam Mộc (陶甘沐). When Lý Thái Tổ became emperor of the Lý dynasty, all the officials enthroned him without any debate, and the Early Lê dynasty was abolished after only three emperors.

== Notes ==
Lê Long Đĩnh Early Lê dynasty Born: 986 Died: 1009
Preceded by Lê Trung Tông	Emperor of Đại Cồ Việt; 1005–1009	Succeeded by Lý Thái Tổ (of the Lý dynasty)
