= Kiều Thuận =

Vietnamese warlord

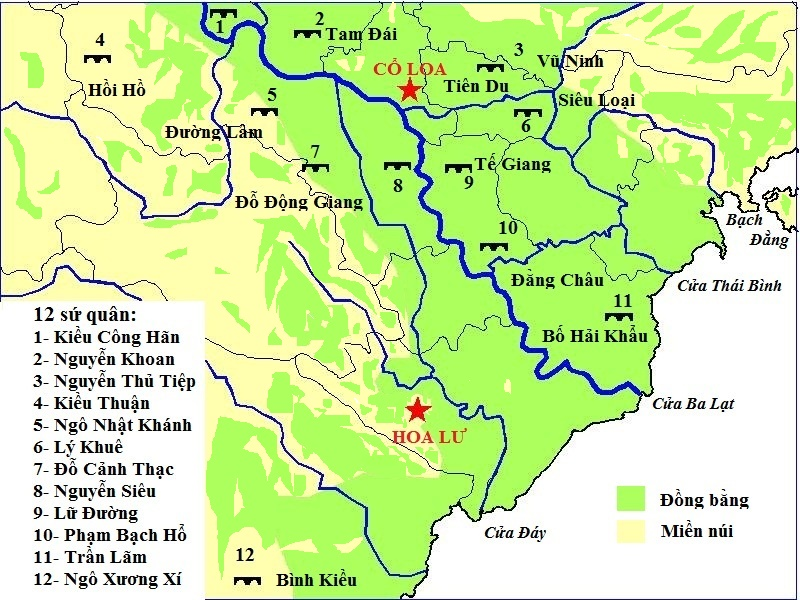
12 Warlords

Kiều Thuận (chữ Hán: 矯順, ?–?) was a warlord of Vietnam during the Period of the 12 Warlords.

Thuận was a grandson of Kiều Công Tiễn. He was also a younger brother of another warlord, Kiều Công Hãn. He held Hồi Hồ (modern Cẩm Khê District, Phú Thọ Province), and titled himself Kiều Lệnh Công (矯令公).
