= Lê Hoàn =

Vietnamese emperor

Lê Đại Hành 黎大行
- Emperor of Đại Cồ Việt
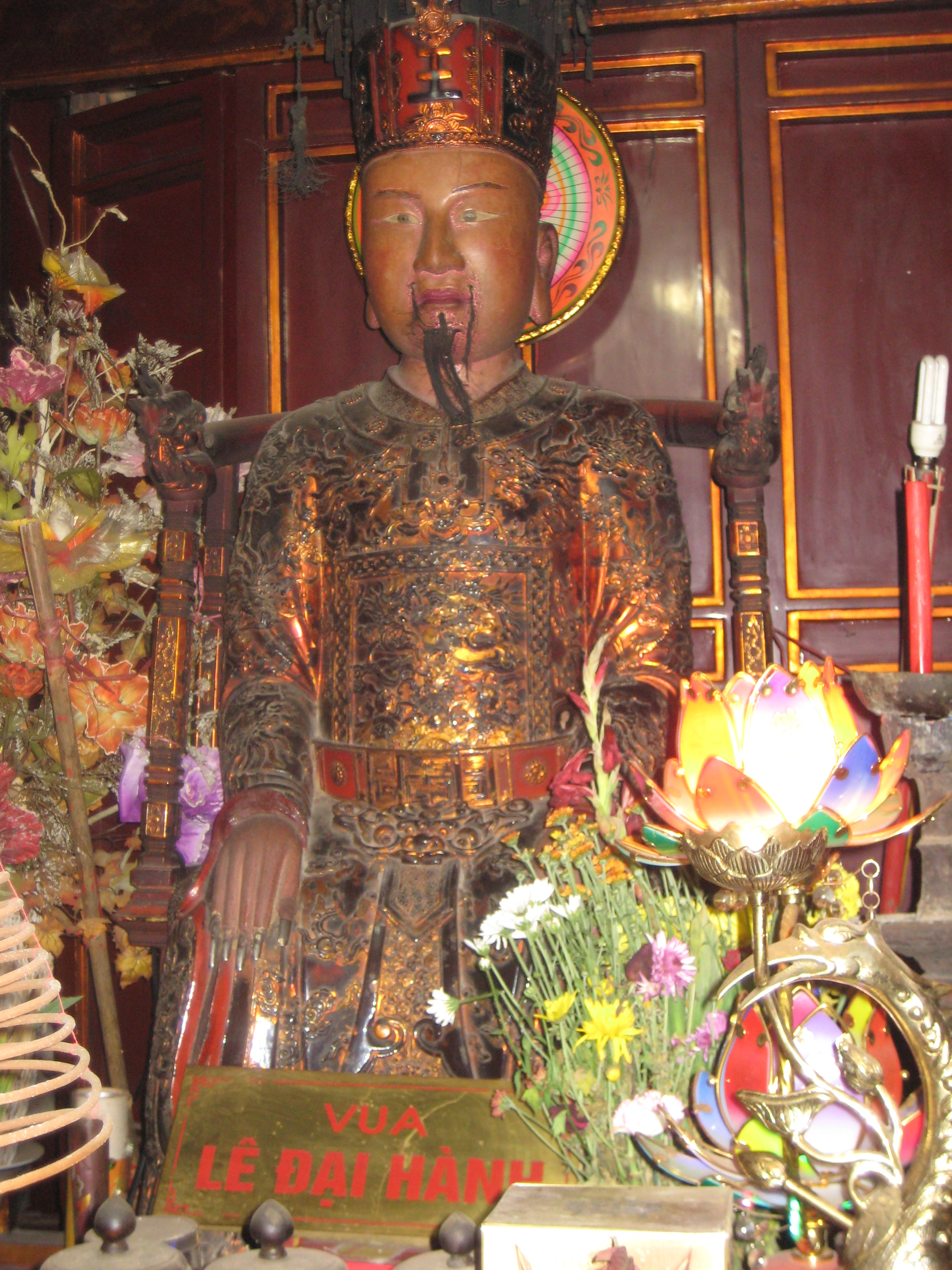
- A statue of emperor Lê Hoàn in ancient capital Trường Yên.

Emperor of Đại Cồ Việt
- Reign: 980–3/1005
- Predecessor: Đinh Phế Đế
- Successor: Lê Trung Tông

Emperor of the Early Lê dynasty
- Reign: 980–3/1005
- Predecessor: dynasty established
- Successor: Lê Trung Tông
- Born: 10 August 941
- Died: 18 March 1005 (aged 63); Trường Xuân palace, Đại Cồ Việt
- Spouse: Empress Dương Vân Nga; Empress Phụng Càn Chí Lý; Empress Thuận Thánh Minh Đạo; Empress Trịnh Quắc; Empress Phạm
- Issue: Lord of Kình Thiên Lê Long Thâu; Duke of Đông Thành Lê Long Tích; Duke of Nam Phong Lê Long Việt (emperor Lê Trung Tông); Duke of Ngự Man Lê Long Đinh; Duke of Khai Minh Lê Long Đĩnh (emperor Lê Ngọa Triều); Duke of Ngự Bắc Lê Long Cân; Duke of Định Phiên Lê Long Tung; 66 other children
Names
- Lê Hoàn (黎桓)
Era dates
- Thiên Phúc (天福: 980–988); Hưng Thống (興統: 989–993); Ứng Thiên (應天: 994–1005)
Regnal name
- Minh Càn Ứng Vận Thần Vũ Thăng Bình Chí Nhân Quảng Hiếu Hoàng Đế (明乾應運神武昇平至仁廣孝皇帝)
- House: Lê
- Father: Lê Mịch
- Mother: Đặng Thị
- Religion: Unknown but probably followed Buddhism

- Posthumously name
- Vietnamese alphabet: Lê Đại Hành
- Chữ Hán: 黎大行

- Personal name
- Vietnamese alphabet: Lê Hoàn
- Chữ Hán: 黎桓

Lê Hoàn (10 August 941 – 18 March 1005), posthumously title Lê Đại Hành, was the founding emperor of the Early Lê dynasty, who ruled Đại Cồ Việt from 981 to 1005. The Ministry of Culture, Sports and Tourism of the Socialist Republic of Vietnam officially designated him as one of the 14 Vietnamese national heroes.

Lê Hoàn first served as the generalissimo commanding a ten-thousand man army of the Đại Việt court under the reign of Đinh Bộ Lĩnh. Following the death of Đinh Bộ Lĩnh in late 979, Lê Hoàn became regent to Đinh Bộ Lĩnh's successor, the six-year-old Đinh Toàn. Lê Hoàn deposed the boy king, married his mother, Queen Dương Vân Nga, and in 980 he became the ruler.

Some modern historians hypothesize that Dương Vân Nga intrigued with Lê Hoàn to assassinate Đinh Bộ Lĩnh and Đinh Liễn to enthrone her son, Đinh Toàn but this is not popularly confirmed. However, the talent and contributions of Lê Hoàn is undeniable. He commanded the national army, which fended off a northern invasion in 981, then led a seaborne invasion of the southern Champa kingdom in 982. He achieved many notable accomplishments in governance, such as promoting agricultural development, establishing schools, and recruiting talented individuals. Besides the successful military campaign against the Song and Champa, Le Hoan also effectively suppressed domestic rebellions, conquered various tribes and barbarians, making them capitulate to the dynasty, and expand the territory of Đại Cồ Việt. Those reasons have led many scholars and historians, such as Lê Văn Hưu and Ngô Sĩ Liên, to praise him as a great emperor who contributed to the nation's prosperity.

== Early career ==
Lê Hoàn was born on August 10, 941, in Ái Province (present-day Thanh Hóa), to a father named Lê Mịch. According to Đại Việt sử ký toàn thư, Lê Hoàn's mother's surename is Đặng, so she was called "Đặng thị" in Vietnamese. The book Các triều đại Việt Nam (Vietnamese dynasties) states that his mother’s name was Đặng Thị Sen. The birth of Lê Hoàn is depicted with rich mythology in the Đại Việt sử ký toàn thư, stating that during her pregnancy, his mother saw a lotus bloom inside her womb. A local official named Lê Đột was impressed by Lê Hoàn's appearance, saying that "No ordinary person can compare to this child," then adopted him, treated and provided him education as if he was his own son. One winter night, while Lê Hoàn was sleeping in the cold, that local official was startled by the light shining from Lê Hoàn’s room. Upon investigation, he discovered that a golden dragon was covering Lê Hoàn to keep him warm. This convinced him that Lê Hoàn was destined for greatness.

He rose to power as a general of the Hoa Lu warlord Đinh Bộ Lĩnh. In 968, after defeating all other warlords, Đinh Bộ Lĩnh founded the Đinh dynasty, renamed the Jinghai Circuit to Đại Cồ Việt as his kingdom with Hoa Lu as the capital. Lê Hoàn was appointed the title "General of Ten Circuits" and commander of the kingdom's military.

== Rise to the throne ==
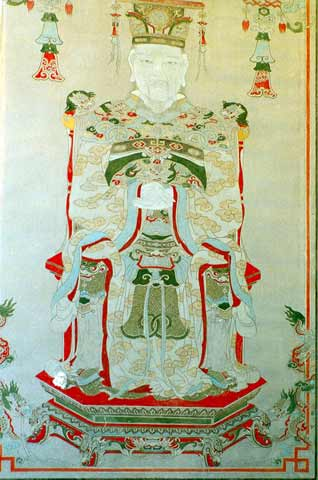
Portrait painting of Lê Hoàn.

In late 979, Đinh Bộ Lĩnh and his son Dinh Lien were slain by an official named Do Thich while sleeping in the courtyard. Following the deaths of the king and the prince, notable members of the court Nguyen Bac and Le Hoan enthroned the six-year-old prince Đinh Toàn as king. However Queen Duong wanted Le Hoan to become the ruler as it would be better for the kingdom. Đinh Toàn gave up the crown while Le Hoan took power with the reign name Thien Phuc, thus transferring power from the Đinh clan to the Le clan.

== War with Song and Champa ==
Disturbances in Dai Viet had attracted attention from the Chinese Song Empire in the north. The emperor Taizong ordered Hou Renbao advance into Dai Viet territories, although Le Hoan had sent a message to the Song court which was declined. In early 981, the Chinese navy under Liu Cheng defeated Le Hoan's military on the Bạch Đằng River, killing 1,000 Viet sailors and seizing 200 junks. Hou Renbao urged his troops to march forward, but they didn't until Liu Cheng finally arrived and the Song land forces and navy regrouped at Da La village, then returned to Hoa Bo (Chi Lăng). Le Hoan pretended to surrender, tricked Hou Renbao to come, and then killed him and massacred his troops. The Song army was forced to retreat and their generals were punished with summary execution in Kaifeng for military failures. The Song then sent three envoys in 986, 998, and 990 to Dai Viet, normalizing the relations between the two countries.

The king of Champa, Paramesvaravarman I, previously had attacked Dai Viet in late 979 in the name of restoring Ngô Nhật Khánh a Vietnamese former warlord during the Period of the 12 Warlords who had escaped to Champa, but the plan failed when a typhoon destroyed most of the Cham fleet including Khanh who drowned. In the next year Le Hoan sent an embassy to Champa, however was detained by the Cham king. The Viet King then led an army stormed south, killed Paramesvaravarman in battle and sacked Indrapura. Paramesvaravarman's Prince Jaya Indravarman IV sought refuge in the south. In the next year, Lưu Kế Tông, a Vietnamese officer in the Cham army, had seized power in Champa and successfully resisted Le Hoan's attempt to remove him from power.

== Kingship ==
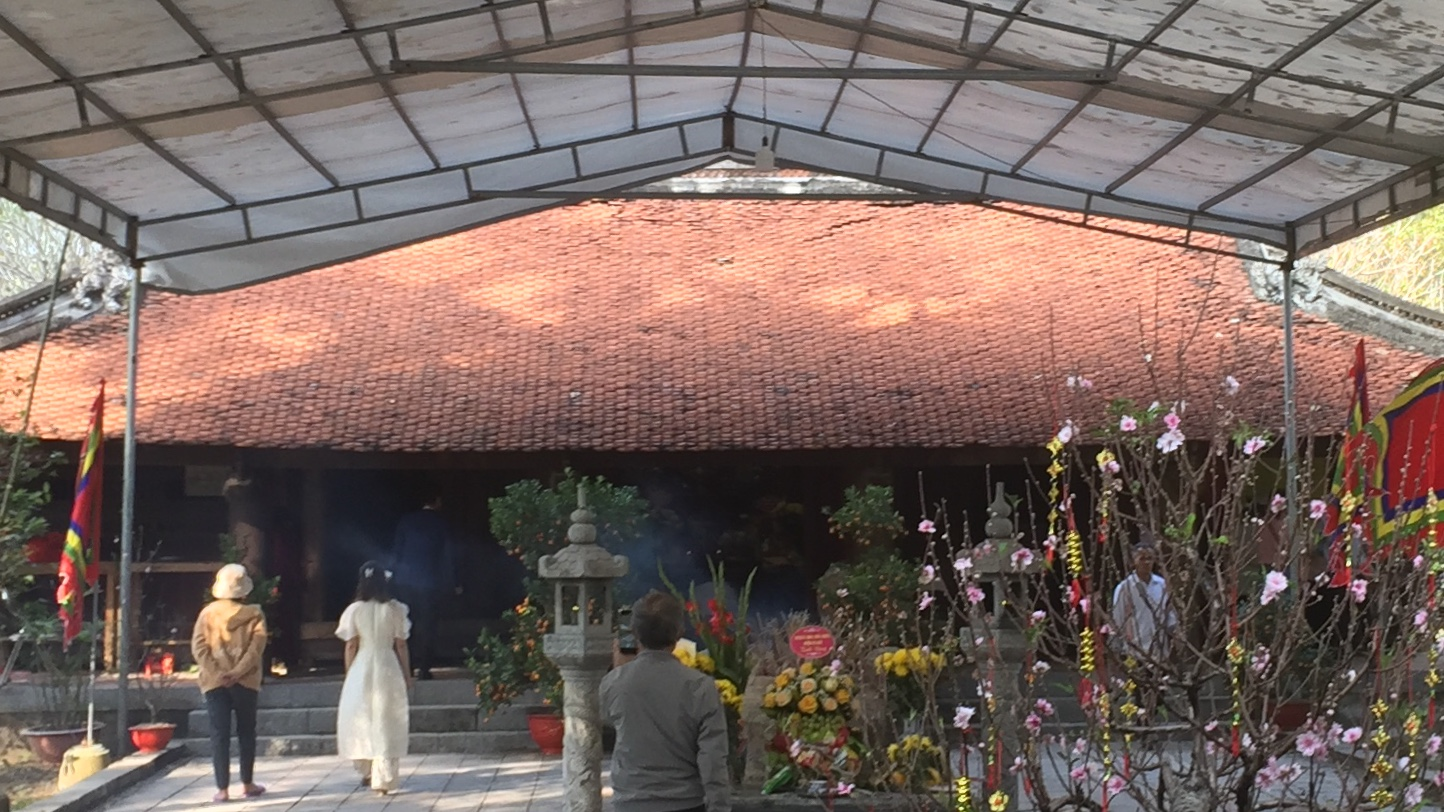
Temple of Lê Hoàn

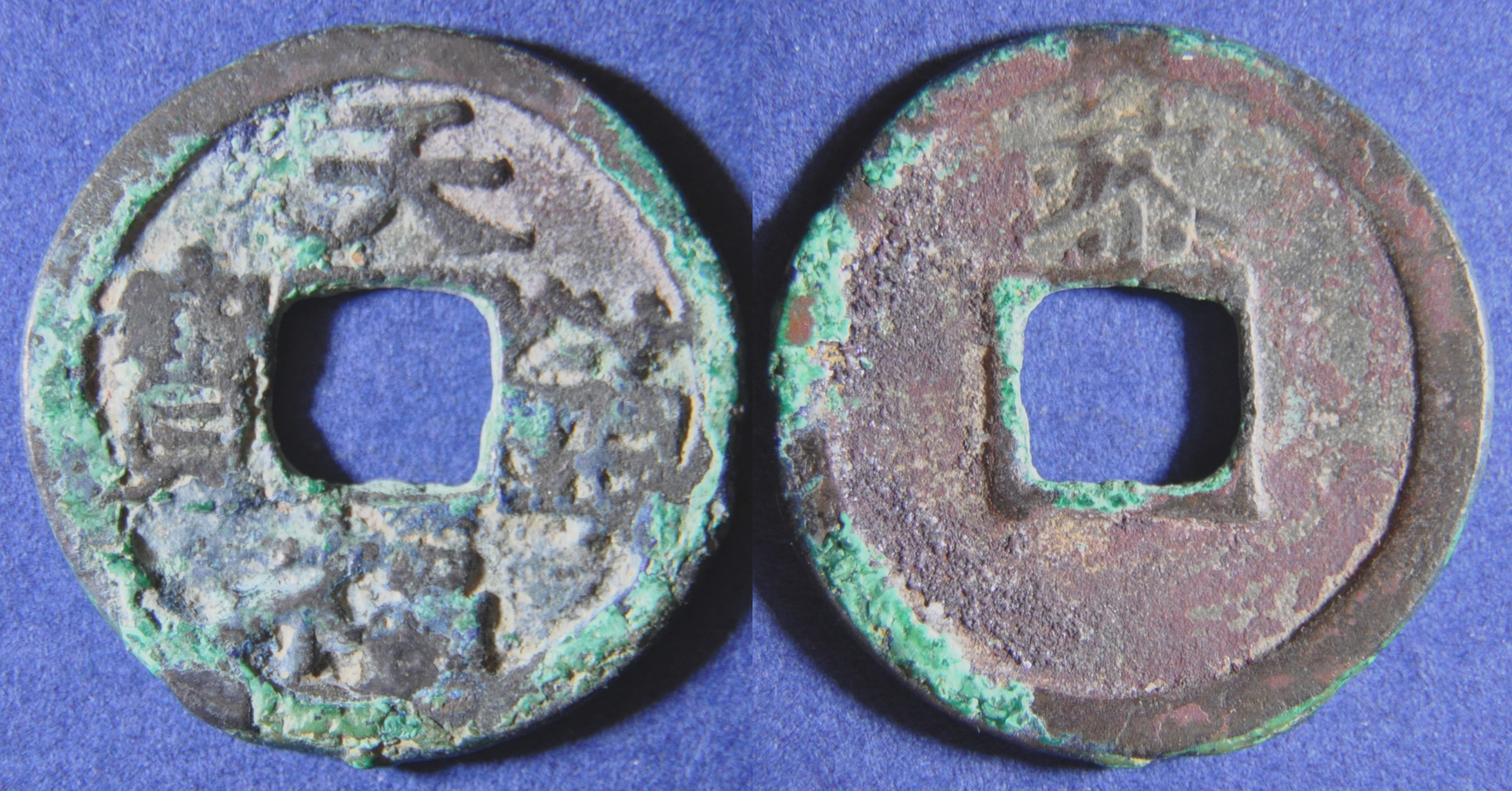
A copper coin of Le Hoan, c. 990

In the court, Le Hoan maintained the Buddhist patriarch Khuông Việt as the great preceptor, while appointing a Chinese named Hongjian as the position of classic and history expert of the court. He established five queens as minor wives while Queen Duong remained as his first lady. He appointed his family members including his brother and his sons to rule other parts of the kingdom. In 987, five years after a drought in 982, Le Hoan held a Royal Ploughing Ceremony on two rice fields and put a pot of gold in each. In 995, he built the Mahayana Nhat Tru church and temple in Hoa Lu and left inscriptions on it, cited verses from the Śūraṅgama Sūtra.

Beside the military campaigns against the Song and Champa, Lê Hoàn also faced internal rebellions, as well as launched conquests to expand the territory of Đại Cồ Việt. In 989, a provincial governor named Dương Tiến Lộc was appointed by Lê Hoàn to collect taxes in the two provinces Hoan and Ái (which are present days Nghệ An and Thanh Hóa). Tiến Lộc took advantages of that to seize controls of those two provinces then sought annexation by Champa, which was rejected. Upon learning of Tiến Lộc's treasonous act, Lê Hoàn launched a military campaign to Hoan and Ái provinces, which resulted in Tiến Lộc's capture and the slaughter of countless civilians in those regions by the national army.

Bốc Văn Dũng, based in Triều Dương of Đại Cồ Việt, committed murder and rebelled against the emperor before fleeing to the town of Như Tích, a town under the Song dynasty, as a political refugee. As the commissioner of the town of Ruhong (next to Như Tích) of Qinzhou refused to extradite Bốc Văn Dũng, in early 995, 100 Viet warships sailed onto Yongzhou (Nanning, Guangxi), sacked the town of Ruhong before leaving. In summer, Le Hoan's local officials from To Mau (modern-day Quang Ninh) led a village force of 5,000 men and sailors who invaded China, plundered Luzhou near Yongzhou, but were defeated by Chinese general Yang Wenjie. In 996, Le Hoan personally led a campaign to conquer the four tribes of Đại, Phát, Đan and Ba in Ma Hoàng, which resulted in a victory for the emperor. The lands of these tribes were subsequently annexed into his dynasty. In July 996, a rebellion broke out in Đỗ Động Giang, a military base that had previously been established by Đỗ Cảnh Thạc during the period of the anarchy of the 12 warlords. Le Hoan personally led a campaign to quell that rebellion and brought the captured rebels back to the capital. After the sacking in Yongzhou in 995, Guangxi authorities launched an investigation into Bốc Văn Dũng and arrested him along with his followers for extradition to Đại Cồ Việt. Lê Hoàn was pleased by that and extradited the captured pirates to the Guangxi authorities in returns. He also agreed to make peace with the Song dynasty after the incident in 995.

In 999, the emperor personally led a campaign to conquer a total of 49 tribes in Hà Động. The Nhật Tắc tribe and others in Định Biên province were defeated. Since then, the remaining tribes capitulated to the emperor. In 1000, the emperor issued an imperial edict to launch a campaign against an army led by Trịnh Hàng, Trường Lệ and Đan Trường Ôn in Phong province, forcing them to flee to the Tản Viên mountain. Historical sources such as the Đại Việt sử ký toàn thư do not clearly state what crimes these leaders had committed against the dynasty that prompted the campaign.

In 1001, a rebellion broke out in Cử Long in Thanh Hóa province which the emperor led a campaign to quell. The rebels were so panicked that they dropped their arrows and snapped their bowstrings when aiming at the national army led by the emperor, ultimately leading to their retreat. Lê Hoàn then led the navy in pursuit of the rebels to the Cùng Giang River. The rebels deployed along the riverbanks to resist the national army. The former king of the Đinh dynasty, Đinh Toàn - now holding the title Duke of Vệ - was struck by an arrow and killed on the battlefield. Lê Hoàn cried out upon Đinh Toàn's death, then continued the battle, which ultimately ended in the rebels' defeat. In 1003, Lê Hoàn marched into Hoan Châu, and ordered the excavation of the Đa Cái Canal, extending it directly to the region of Tư Củng in Ái Châu. However, the people of Đa Cái suddenly rebelled against the emperor and were swiftly defeated and beheaded.

In 1004, Le Hoan sent a mission to China led by one of his sons, Prince Lê Minh Đề. Minh Đề was invited for the 1005 Lunar New Year Festival's feast of the Song court along with emissaries of Champa and Arabic-speaking traders. The Song records treated Dai Viet along with Java, Pagan, and the Arabs as equal sovereign states. Outside China and Champa, a Khmer inscription dated 987 records the arrival of Vietnamese merchants in Angkor.

== Death ==
In 1005, he died at age 64 while a civil war for succession erupted between his sons. He was called Đại Hành Hoàng đế (大行皇帝; literally "the Departed Emperor") after his death and later became his posthumously title. His twenty-years old fifth son Le Long Dinh seized the throne in later that year after murdering his older brother Lê Long Việt who only held the crown in 3 days, and ruled the country for the next four years.

== Family ==
- Parents
  - Lê Mịch (黎覔)
  - Đặng Thị Sen (鄧氏𬞮)
- Wives
  - Lady Dương Vân Nga (楊雲娥, 942 – 1000)
  - Phụng Càn Chí Lý Hoàng hậu (奉乾至理皇后)
  - Thuận Thánh Minh Đạo Hoàng hậu (順聖明道皇后)
  - Lady Trịnh Quắc (鄭國皇后)
  - Lady Phạm (范皇后)
- Children
  - Lê Long Thâu (黎龍鍮, ? – 1000), first son
  - Lê Long Tích (黎龍錫; ? – 1005), second son
  - Lê Long Việt (黎龍鉞, 983 – 1005), successor, reigned 3 days (the shortest reign of Vietnamese monarchs), third son
  - Lê Long Đinh (黎龍釘, 986 – ?), fourth son
  - Lê Long Đĩnh (黎龍鋌, 986 – 1009, the third monarch of the family), fifth son
  - Lê Long Cân (黎龍釿), sixth son
  - Lê Long Tung (黎龍鏦), seventh son
  - Lê Long Tương (黎龍鏘), eighth son
  - Lê Long Kính (黎龍鏡, ? – 1005), ninth son
  - Lê Long Mang (黎龍鋩), tenth son
  - Lê Minh Đề (黎明提), eleventh son
  - Dương Hy Liễn, adopted daughter
  - Lê Thị Phất Ngân (黎氏佛銀, 981 – ?), wife of Lý Công Uẩn

Preceded by Đinh Phế Đế (Đinh dynasty)	Emperor of Đại Cồ Việt; 980–1005	Succeeded by Lê Trung Tông
