= Đinh Phế Đế =

Đinh Phế Đế 丁廢帝
- Emperor of Đại Cồ Việt
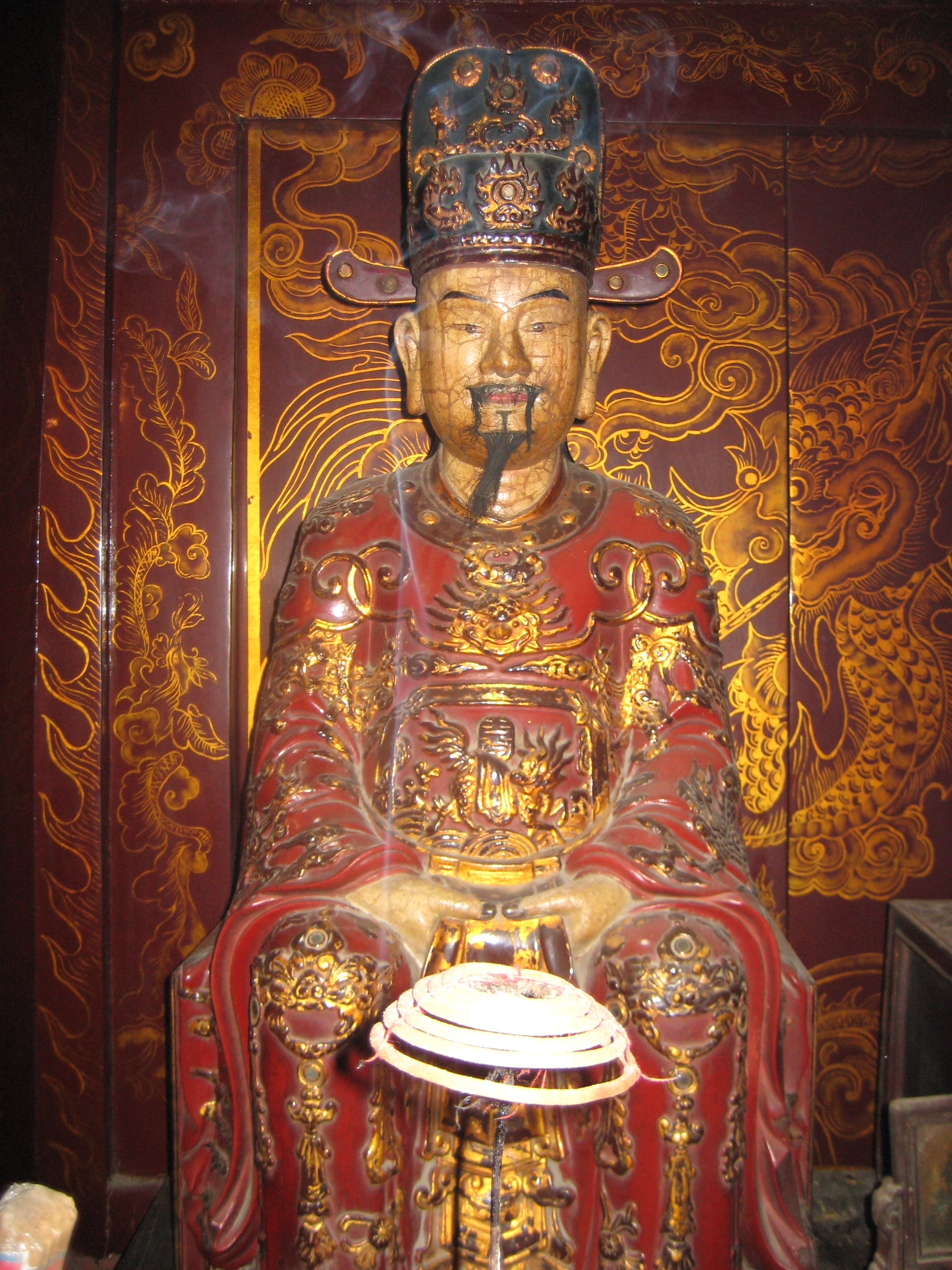
- A statue of emperor Đinh Phế Đế in Hoa Lư

Emperor of Đại Cồ Việt
- Reign: 979–980
- Predecessor: Đinh Bộ Lĩnh
- Successor: Lê Đại Hành (Emperor of Early Lê dynasty)
- Regent: Lê Đại Hành

Emperor of the Đinh dynasty
- Reign: 979–980
- Predecessor: Đinh Bộ Lĩnh
- Successor: Dynasty collapsed
- Born: 974; Hoa Lư, Đại Cồ Việt
- Died: 1001 (aged 26-27); Hoa Lư, Đại Cồ Việt
- Burial: Hoa Lư
- Spouse: None
- Issue: None
Names
- Đinh Toàn (丁璿)
- House: Đinh
- Father: Đinh Tiên Hoàng
- Mother: Empress Dương Vân Nga

Đinh Phế Đế (974–1001; literally "Overthrown Emperor of the Đinh") was the second and also the last emperor of the Đinh dynasty. His birth name was Đinh Toàn (丁璿) or Đinh Tuệ (丁穗). He was the son of Đinh Tiên Hoàng and his famous empress Dương Vân Nga (Đinh Bộ Linh conferred the title of Empress on five consorts). In 980, the Regent Lê Hoàn succeeded the throne with support from Đinh Phế Đế's mother "Empress Dương Vân Nga" to lead the country against the Song dynasty invasion. Đinh Phế Đế received the title Duke of Vệ (Vệ Vương) at age 20 and died in battle at the age 27.

== Early years ==
Đinh Phế Đế was born in 974 at Hoa Lư with the birth name Đinh Toàn (丁璿) or Đinh Tuệ (丁穗). He was the second son of Đinh Bộ Lĩnh, after Đinh Liễn and before Đinh Hạng Lang. After Đinh Bộ Lĩnh conferred Đinh Hạng Lang as Crown prince, Đinh Liễn angrily killed his youngest brother. However, he was able to ascend the throne because of an absurdity that arose when a small official named Đỗ Thích dreamed of his accession to the throne and subsequently assassinated both Đinh Bộ Lĩnh and Đinh Liễn.

As emperor, Đinh Toàn obviously became the last heir of Đinh Bộ Lĩnh and enthroning him became inevitable at age six. Some modern historians hypothesize that Dương Vân Nga intrigued with Lê Hoàn to assassinate Đinh Bộ Lĩnh and Đinh Liễn to enthrone her son, but this is not popularly confirmed.

== Short reign ==
His accession took place during his childhood, which made him only a nominal emperor without any power. All power was wielded by the Regent Lê Hoàn, who some months later became the founder of the Lê dynasty. During this short reign, there were some events happening in his court. Two officials, Đinh Điền and Nguyễn Bặc, feared that the power concentrated in Lê Hoàn's hands could soon replace the Đinh dynasty with Lê Hoàn. Also they suspected that he and Dowager Empress Dương Vân Nga had an illicit liaison with Lê Hoàn. They moved against Lê Hoàn but their resistance was soon rapidly suppressed.

The prince consort Ngô Nhật Khánh fled to Champa, and convinced their monarch, Parameshvaravarman I, to dispatch a naval fleet to attack the Hoa Lư capital. However, this campaign ended in disaster when a surprise storm sank many of the vessels.

== Threat from invaders ==
In 980, after hearing about the demise of Đinh Bộ Lĩnh, the Song emperor dispatched his army to invade Đại Cồ Việt (the name of Vietnam during the Đinh dynasty). In response, Dowager Empress Dương Vân Nga and the court unanimously enthroned Lê Hoàn to be the emperor of Đại Cồ Việt because the current emperor was too young. After battling the Song army twice, Lê Hoàn (now emperor Lê Đại Hành) expelled the invaders from his realm. As such, the reign of Đinh Toàn came to an end and the Đinh dynasty collapsed in 980.

== Later years ==
After being dethroned, Đinh Toàn became "Vệ Vương", a noble title similar to that of landlord or some kin of the emperor. By the year 1001, when repressing the rebellion of Cửu Long in Thanh Hóa Province, he was hit by an arrow and died immediately at the age of 27.

Nowadays, historical books have named his title "Đinh Phế Đế", which means "the deposed emperor of the Đinh dynasty."

== Notes ==
| Preceded by Đinh Tiên Hoàng | Emperor of Đại Cồ Việt; 979–980 | Succeeded by Lê Đại Hành (Early Lê dynasty) |
