= Đinh Liễn =

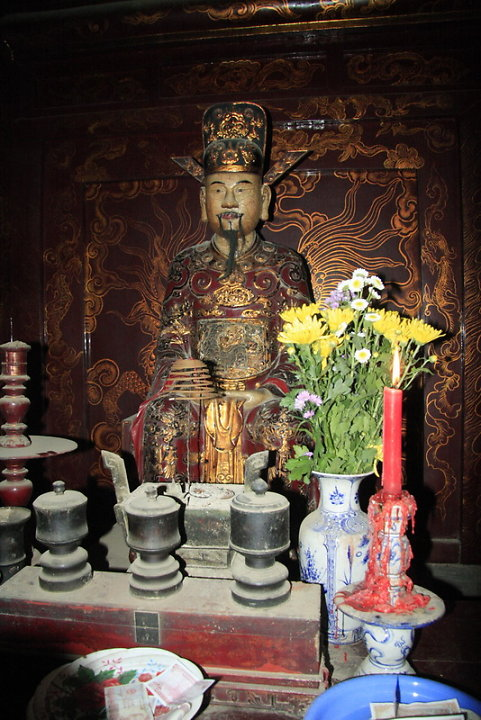
Đinh Liễn

Đinh Liễn (丁璉, 945 – October 979) or Đinh Khuông Liễn (丁匡璉), was the eldest son of emperor Đinh Bộ Lĩnh, the founding emperor of Đinh dynasty.

Liễn was granted the title Nam Việt vương (南越王, "king of Nam Việt") after his father ascended the throne. Liễn was sent to Song China to pay tribute in 973, and was granted the title Grand Preceptor of Inspection (檢校太師 Kiểm hiệu thái sư), Jiedushi of Tĩnh Hải quân (靜海軍節度使 Tĩnh Hải quân tiết độ sứ) and Governor of the Protectorate General to Pacify the South (安南都護 An Nam đô hộ) by Song Taizu. In 975, his title was promoted to "Prince of Giao Chỉ" (交趾郡王, Giao Chỉ quận vương) by Song court. Liễn was regarded as the ruler of Vietnam by Song China, though his father was the de facto ruler.

In 978, emperor Đinh Tiên Hoàng made the controversial decision of designating the 4 year old Đinh Hạng Lang as the crown prince, despite oppositions from officials. This designation enraged Đinh Tiên Hoàng's first son Đinh Liễn, who spent his childhood fighting for his father cause during Anarchy of the 12 Warlords. Before that, back when he was a toddler, his enemies held him hostage, and his father attempted to kill him so that their enemies would lose leverage. He previously forgave his father for this, but now he felt that he was wronged by his father again.

In the spring of 979, Đinh Liễn dispatched his subordinates to assassinate his 5 year old half brother Crown Prince Hạng Lang. This assassination distressed Đinh Tiên Hoàng and his wives, who could not have done anything to stop it.

So, to assuage his parents, Đinh Liễn employed masons to carve the Uṣṇīṣa Vijaya Dhāraṇī Sūtra on 100 columns, dedicated them to his deceased younger brother and other deceased people's souls; and prayed for their release from litigations and strifes. Their remains had fallen into oblivion for almost 1,000 years and were only discovered in 1963.

Đinh Liễn didn't have the chance to take his crown prince title however. In the winter of 979, emperor Đinh Tiên Hoàng was assassinated, and Đinh Liễn himself was also assassinated when he bumped into the fleeing assassin.

The records and stories are vague and inconsistent about the assassin's identities, going as far as claiming Đinh Liễn personally murdered Hạng Lang, or accused Đỗ Thích of assassinating all 3 (Đinh Hạng Lang, Đinh Tiên Hoàng, Đinh Liễn), which Đỗ Thích was hastily executed by an Nguyễn Bặc without evidence. Đỗ Thích consistently saved Đinh family lives numerous times during Anarchy of the 12 Warlords. There are also accusations of Lê Hoàn being involved in the assassinations, even being the mastermind behind the end of Đinh dynasty.

The real assassin of 3 Đinh royalties remains unconfirmed up to this day.
