= History of Vietnam =

Vietnam, with its coastal strip, rugged mountainous interior, and two major deltas, became home to numerous cultures throughout history. Its strategic geographical position in Southeast Asia also made it a crossroads of trade and a focal point of conflict, contributing to its complex and eventful past. During the Paleolithic period, the first Ancient East Eurasian hunter-gatherers arrived at least 40,000 years ago. Since the Neolithic period, Austroasiatic, as well as Austronesian, Hmong–Mien, Kra–Dai, and Sino-Tibetan peoples that lived across Southeast Asia and Southern China, contributed to the agricultural development and ethnolinguistic landscape of Vietnam. In the first millennium BCE the Đông Sơn culture emerged, based on rice cultivation and focused on the indigenous chiefdoms of Văn Lang and Âu Lạc.

Following the 111 BCE Han conquest of Nanyue, much of Vietnam came under Chinese dominance for a thousand years. The period nonetheless saw numerous uprisings and cultural interactions between the Chinese imperial government and local population. Buddhism and Hinduism arrived by the 2nd century CE, making Vietnam the first place which shared influences of both Chinese and Indian cultures.

Follow the collapse of China's Tang dynasty in 907, the Viets began to assert their political independence from China. In 938, Ngô Quyền defeated the Southern Han kingdom at the Bạch Đằng River and established the Ngô dynasty. The next millennium saw a succession of Viet dynasties: Đinh, Former Lê, Lý, Trần, Hồ, Later Lê, Mạc, Tây Sơn, and finally Nguyễn. In 1010, the Lý established Thăng Long (Hanoi) as Đại Việt's capital, which remained as the Vietnamese political center until 1802 when Gia Long moved the capital to Huế. Between 1533 and 1802, Đại Việt was periodically divided by civil wars, most notably the Lê–Mạc War (1533–1593) and the Trịnh–Nguyễn War (1627–1672). Amidst the long period of political disunity, Vietnamese settlers seized Central Vietnam, Mekong Delta, and parts of today's Cambodia between the 15th and 18th centuries from the indigenous Cham and Khmer peoples.

Leveraging its military support for the ascendant Nguyễn dynasty and using the pretexts of protecting religious freedom and trading rights, France conquered Vietnam between 1858 to 1887, dividing its territory into three separate regions, integrating them into French Indochina in 1887. The Second World War brought a 5-year occupation by Imperial Japan. In 1945, Ho Chi Minh and the Viet Minh proclaimed the independence of Democratic Republic of Vietnam (DRV), but a three-way conflict immediately broke out between communists, anti-communists, and the returning French army. Nine years later, the force of the DRV defeated the French army at the Battle of Dien Bien Phu. Following the French defeat, Vietnam was divided into two states in July. As part of the Cold War, a war quickly broke out between the DRV in the north, supported by the People's Republic of China and the Soviet Union, and the Republic of Vietnam (RVN) in the south, aided by the United States. It ended with the defeat of the South in 1975 and unification under a communist government in 1976. The newly established Socialist Republic of Vietnam (SRV) then fought a war with China in 1979 and was bogged down in Cambodia from 1978 to 1989, along with an economic disaster that led to Đổi Mới in late 1986. Vietnam normalized relations with China in 1991 and the United States in 1995.

== Prehistory ==
=== Modern ethnic context ===
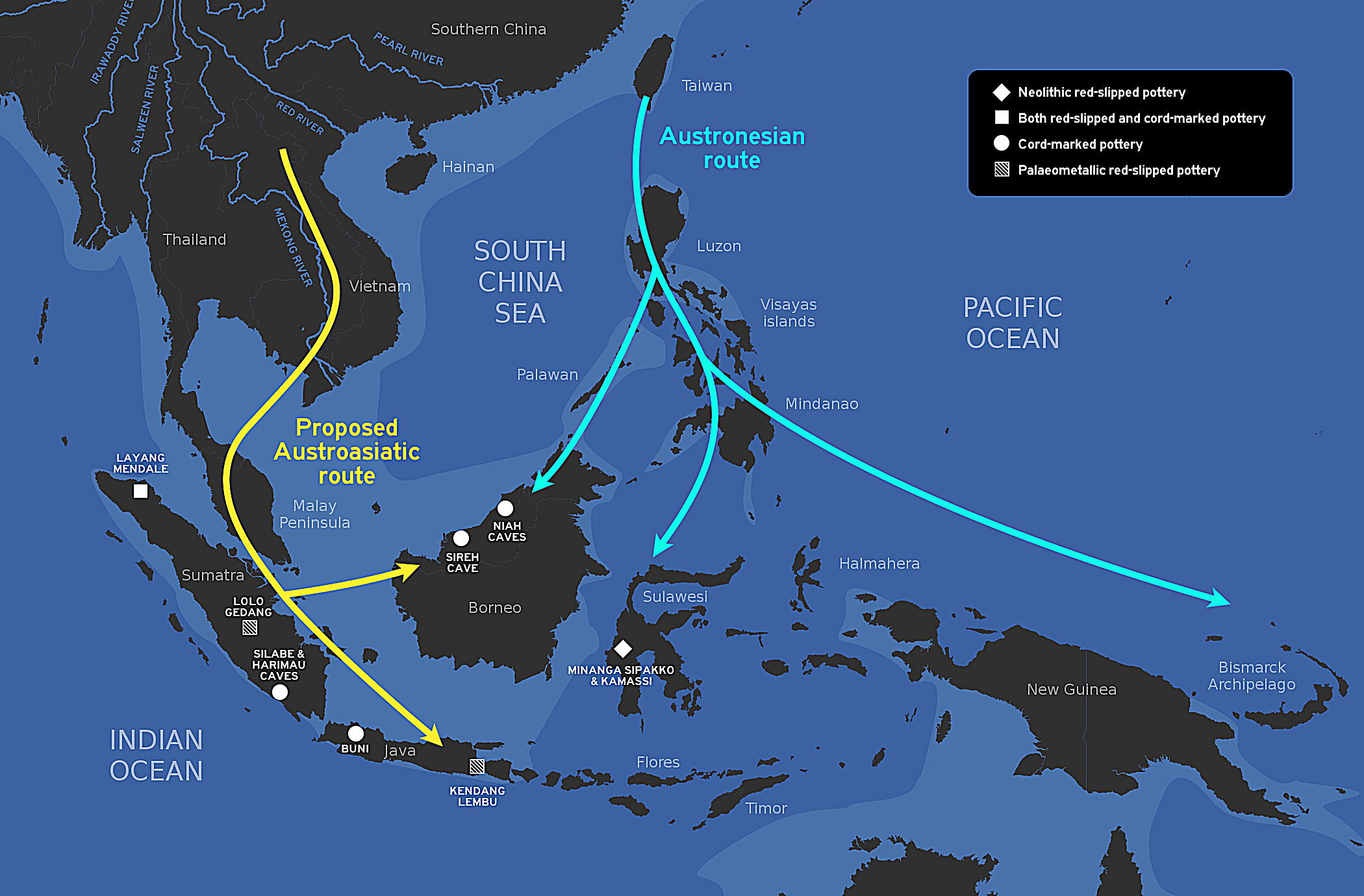
Proposed neolithic migration paths into Southeast Asia, with Austronesian peoples from the sea and Austroasiatic peoples from inland Mekong which supposed to take place around the third millennium BCE.

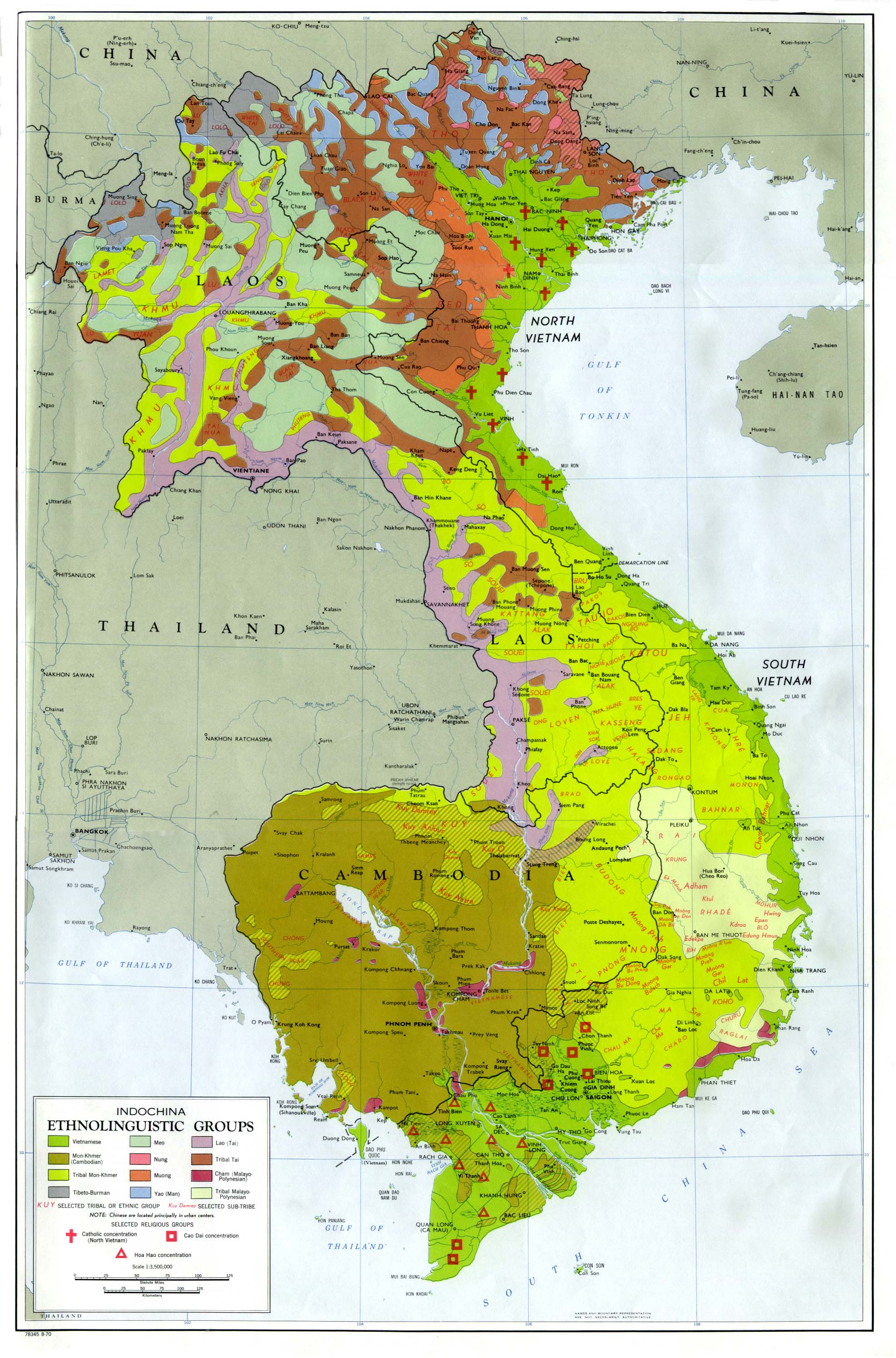
Ethnolinguistic map of Indochina, 1970

Vietnam's modern demography consists of 54 different ethnicities belonging to five major ethnolinguistic families: Austronesian, Austroasiatic, Hmong–Mien, Kra–Dai, Sino-Tibetan. Among 54 groups, the majority ethnic group is the Vietic-speaking Kinh, alone comprising 85.32% of total population in the 2019 census. The rest is made up of 53 other ethnic groups. Vietnam's ethnic mosaic results from the peopling process in which various peoples came and settled the territory, leading to the modern state of Vietnam by many stages, often separated by thousands of years over a duration of tens of thousands of years. Vietnam's entire history, thus, is an embroidery of polyethnicity.

=== Pre-Neolithic ===
Early anatomically modern human settlement in mainland Southeast Asia dates back 65 to 10,5 kya (65,000 years ago), during the Late Pleistocene period. Probably the foremost hunter-gatherers were the Hoabinhians, a large group that gradually settled across Southeast Asia. As part of the Initial Upper Paleolithic wave, the Hoabinhians, along with the Tianyuan man, are early members of the Ancient East and Southeast Asian (ESEA) lineage deeply related to present-day East and Southeast Asians. The southern dispersal is associated with the subclades of notable Y-chromosome haplogroups such as C2, D1, N, and O.

Both ancient and modern East Asian-related populations can be modeled to descend primarily from the Hoabinhian or Onge-related lineage (c. 76–79%), and to a lesser extent from a Tianyuan-related lineage (c. 21–24%). The Tianyuan man itself has been modeled to primarily descend from an Onge-related lineage (c. 61%), and a more deeply diverged East Eurasian lineage (c. 39%) distantly related to remains from the Bacho Kiro cave.

An analysis of individuals from the Con Co Ngua site in Thanh Hoa, Vietnam about 6,200 years BP, when restricted to Vietnamese comparisons, showed the closest distance to peoples from Mai Da Dieu, followed by present-day Vietnamese populations. Based on craniometric and dental nonmetric analysis, the Con Co Ngua individuals were phenotypically similar to Late Pleistocene Southeast Asians and modern Melanesians and Aboriginal Australians.

=== Neolithic period ===
Neolithic Vietnam

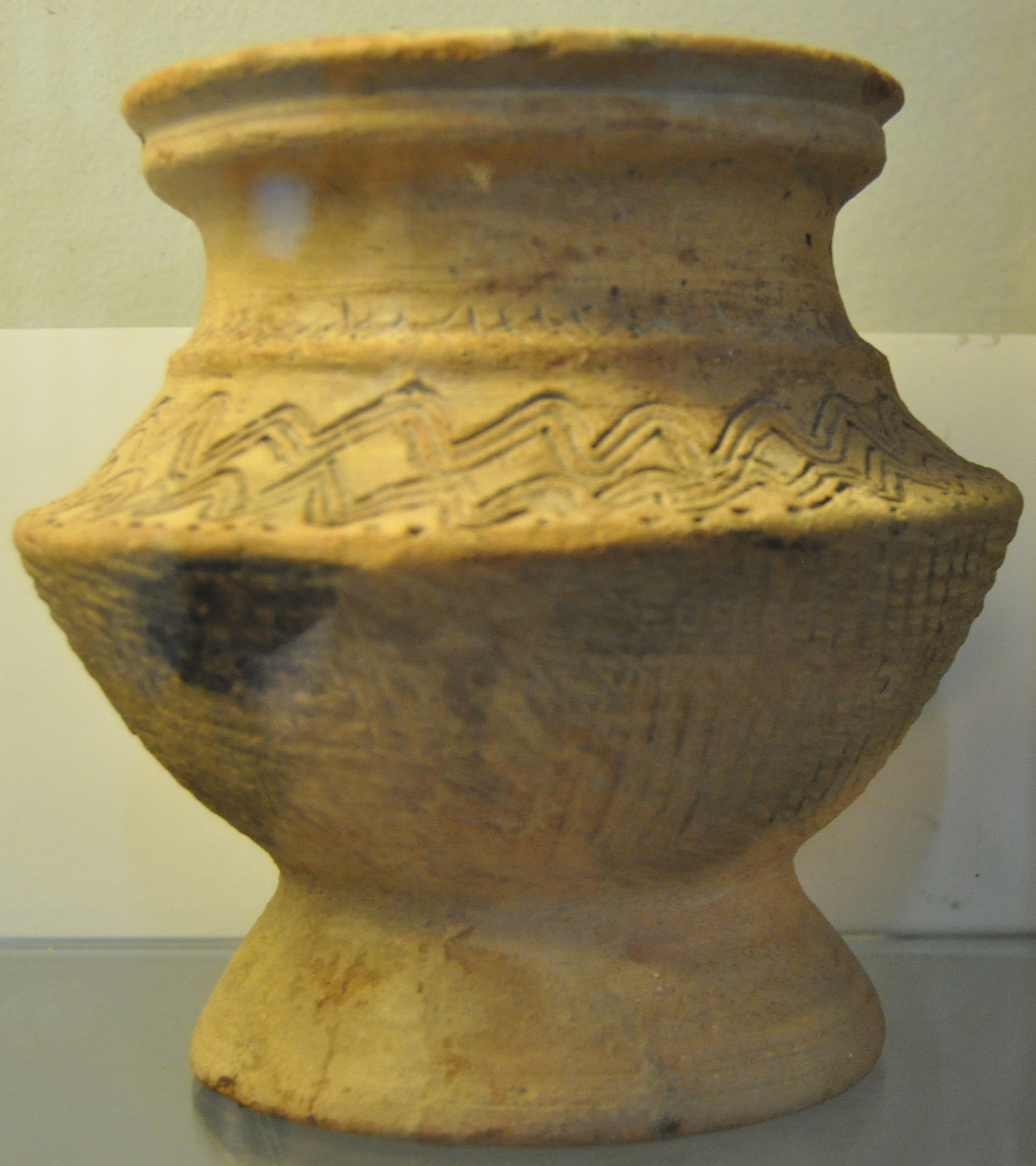
Sa Huynh vase, 500 BCE

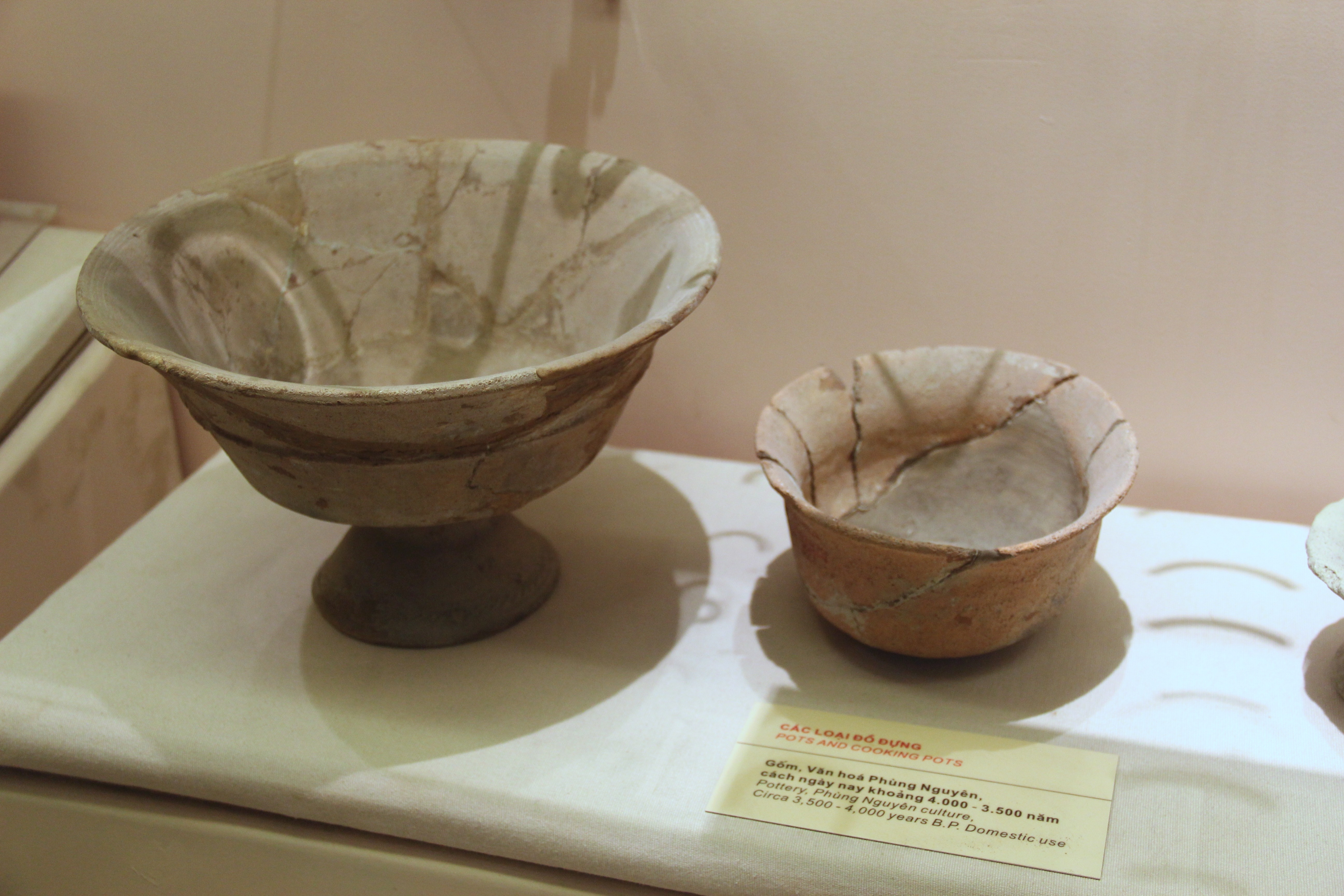
Phung Nguyen cooking pots, 2,000–1,500 BCE

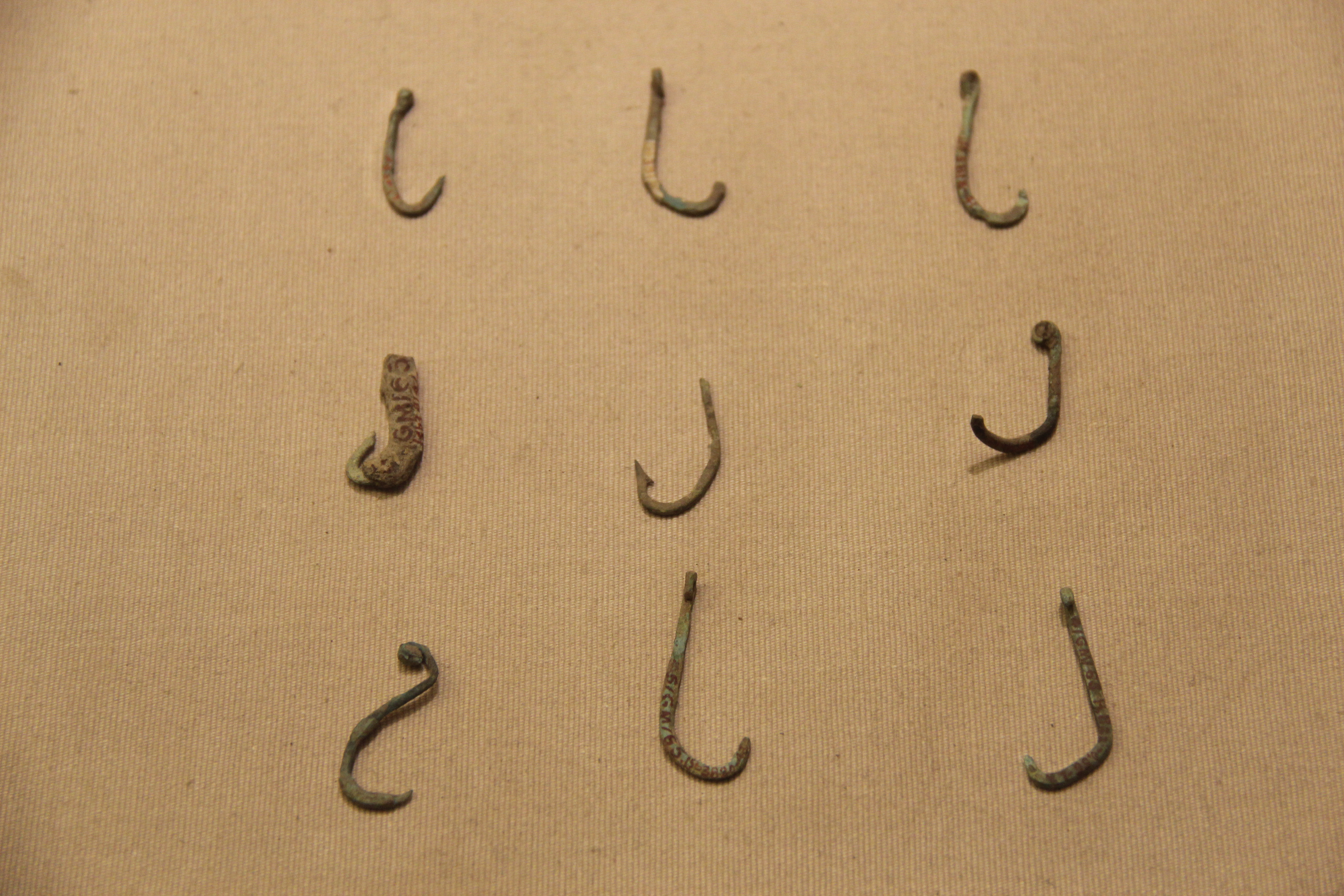
Go Mun fishing hooks, 1,100–800 BCE

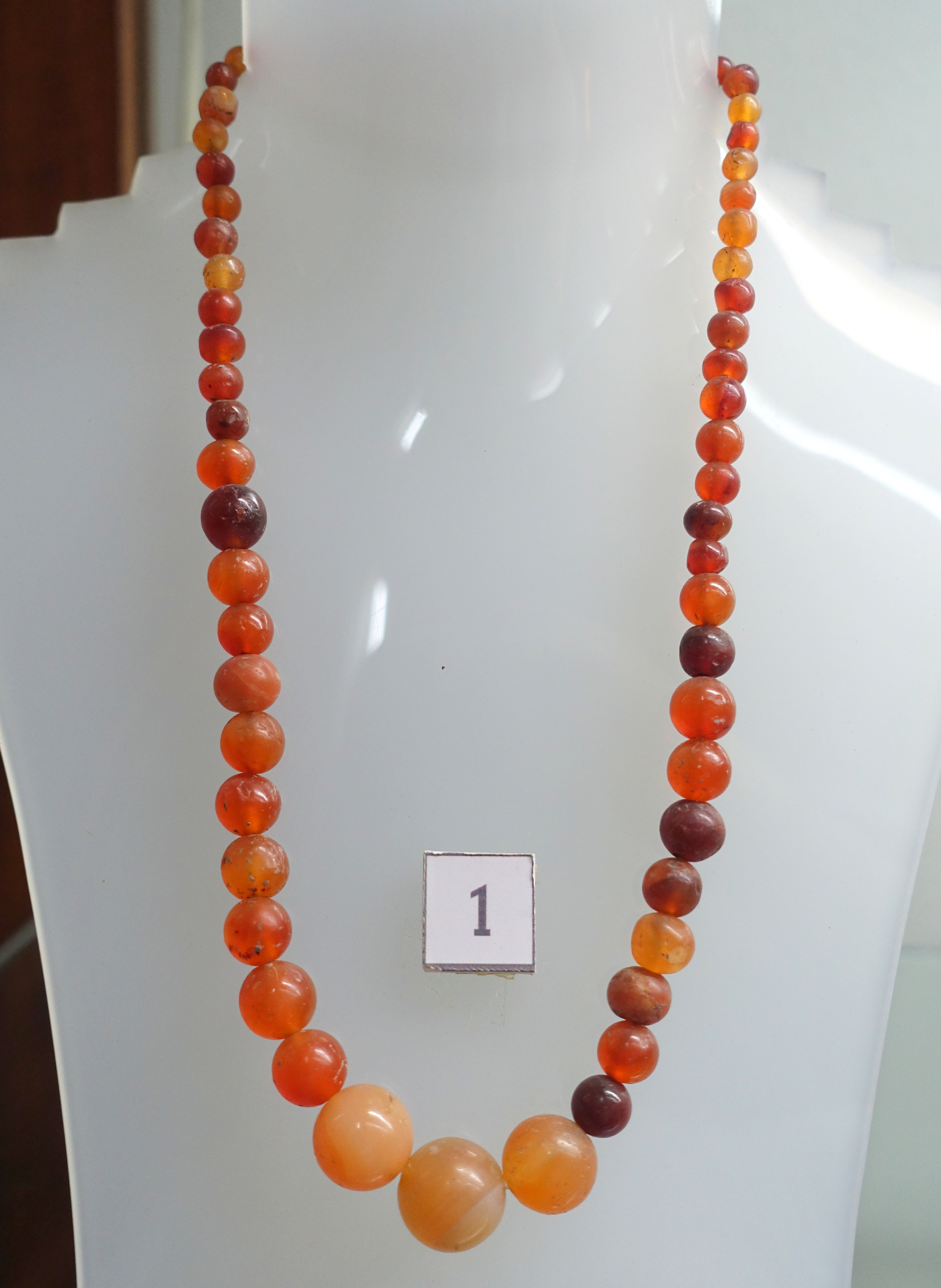
Giong Ca Vo agate necklace, 500 BCE

After the emergence of the East Asian lineage from Hoabinhian or Onge-related and Tianyuan-related ancestries, this lineage had further diversified into multiple sublineages, including the Ancient Southern East Asian lineage. During the Neolithic period, Ancient Southern East Asian-related populations was characterized to expand across the neighboring parts of southern China to Southeast Asia. The earliest agricultural societies that cultivated millet and wet-rice emerged by 1700 BCE in the lowlands and river floodplains of Vietnam are associated with this Neolithic migration.

Starting from the third millennium BCE, rice farming-based agriculture spread from southern East Asia into Mainland and Insular Southeast Asia. This technological spread has been associated with the migration of Neolithic agriculturalists that carried Ancient Southern East Asian-related ancestry. These Neolithic farmers took two routes: an inland route into Mainland Southeast Asia carried out by Austroasiatic speakers, and a maritime route that originated from Taiwan by Austronesian speakers.

In 2018, researchers conducted a genetic analysis on samples taken from two ancient burial sites in northern Vietnam, Mán Bạc and Núi Nấp, dating from 1,800 BCE and 100 BCE, respectively. The individuals at Mán Bạc show a mix of East Asian farmer and East Eurasian hunter-gatherer ancestry, with close genetic affinity for modern Austroasiatic groups like the Mlabri, the Nicobarese, and the Cambodians, while Nui Nap projects close to present-day Vietnamese and Dai. A 2018 study by George van Driem et al. demonstrated that East Asian farmers intermixed with the native inhabitants and contrary to popular opinion, did not replace them. These farmers also shared ancestry with present-day Austroasiatic-speaking hill tribes themselves.

The Cham people, who for over one thousand years settled in controlled and civilized present-day central and southern coastal Vietnam from around the 2nd century AD, are of Austronesian origin. The southernmost sector of Vietnam, the Mekong Delta and its surroundings were, until the 18th century, of integral yet shifting significance within the Austroasiatic Proto-Khmer – and Khmer principalities like Funan, Chenla, the Khmer Empire and the Khmer kingdom.

==== Way of life ====
Situated on the southeast edge of monsoon Asia, much of ancient Vietnam enjoyed a combination of high rainfall, humidity, heat, favorable winds, and fertile soil. These natural sources combined to generate an unusually prolific growth of rice and other plants and wildlife. This region's agricultural villages held well over 90 percent of the population. The high volume of rainy season water required villagers to concentrate their labor in managing floods, transplanting rice, and harvesting. These activities produced a cohesive village life with a religion in which one of the core values was the desire to live in harmony with nature and with other people. The way of life, centered in harmony, featured many enjoyable aspects that the people held beloved, typified by not needing many material things, the enjoyment of music and poetry, and living in harmony with nature.

Fishing and hunting supplemented the main rice crop. Arrowheads and spears were dipped in poison to kill larger animals such as elephants. Betel nuts were widely chewed and the lower classes rarely wore clothing more substantial than a loincloth. Every spring, a fertility festival was held which featured huge parties and sexual abandon.

==== Bronze Age ====
The Red River valley formed a natural geographic and economic unit, bounded to the north and west by mountains and jungles, to the east by the sea and to the south by the Red River Delta. The need to have a single authority to prevent floods of the Red River, to cooperate in constructing hydraulic systems, trade exchange, and to repel invaders, led to the creation of the first legendary Vietnamese states approximately 2879 BCE. Ongoing research from archaeologists has suggested that the Vietnamese Đông Sơn culture were traceable back to northern Vietnam, Guangxi and Laos around 1000 BCE.

Since around 2000 BCE, stone hand tools and weapons improved extraordinarily in both quantity and variety. After this, Vietnam later became part of the Maritime Jade Road, which existed for 3,000 years between 2000 BCE to 1000 CE. Pottery reached a higher level of technique and decoration style. The early farming multilinguistic societies in Vietnam were mainly wet rice Oryza cultivators, which became the main staple of their diet. During the later stage of the first half of the 2nd millennium BCE, the first appearance of bronze tools took place despite these tools still being rare. By about 1000 BCE, bronze replaced stone for about 40 percent of edged tools and weapons, rising to about 60 percent. Here, there were not only bronze weapons, axes, and personal ornaments, but also sickles and other agriculture tools. Toward the closure of the Bronze Age, bronze accounts for more than 90 percent of tools and weapons, and there are exceptionally extravagant graves – the burial places of powerful chieftains – containing some hundreds of ritual and personal bronze artifacts, such as musical instruments, bucket-shaped ladles, and ornament daggers. After 1000 BCE, the ancient peoples of Vietnam became skilled agriculturalists as they grew rice and kept buffaloes and pigs. They were also skilled fishermen and bold sailors, whose long dug-out canoes traversed the eastern sea.

== Ancient period (c. 500–111 BCE) ==
=== Đông Sơn culture and the Legend of Hồng Bàng dynasty ===
Dong Son culture (1,000 BCE – 100 CE)

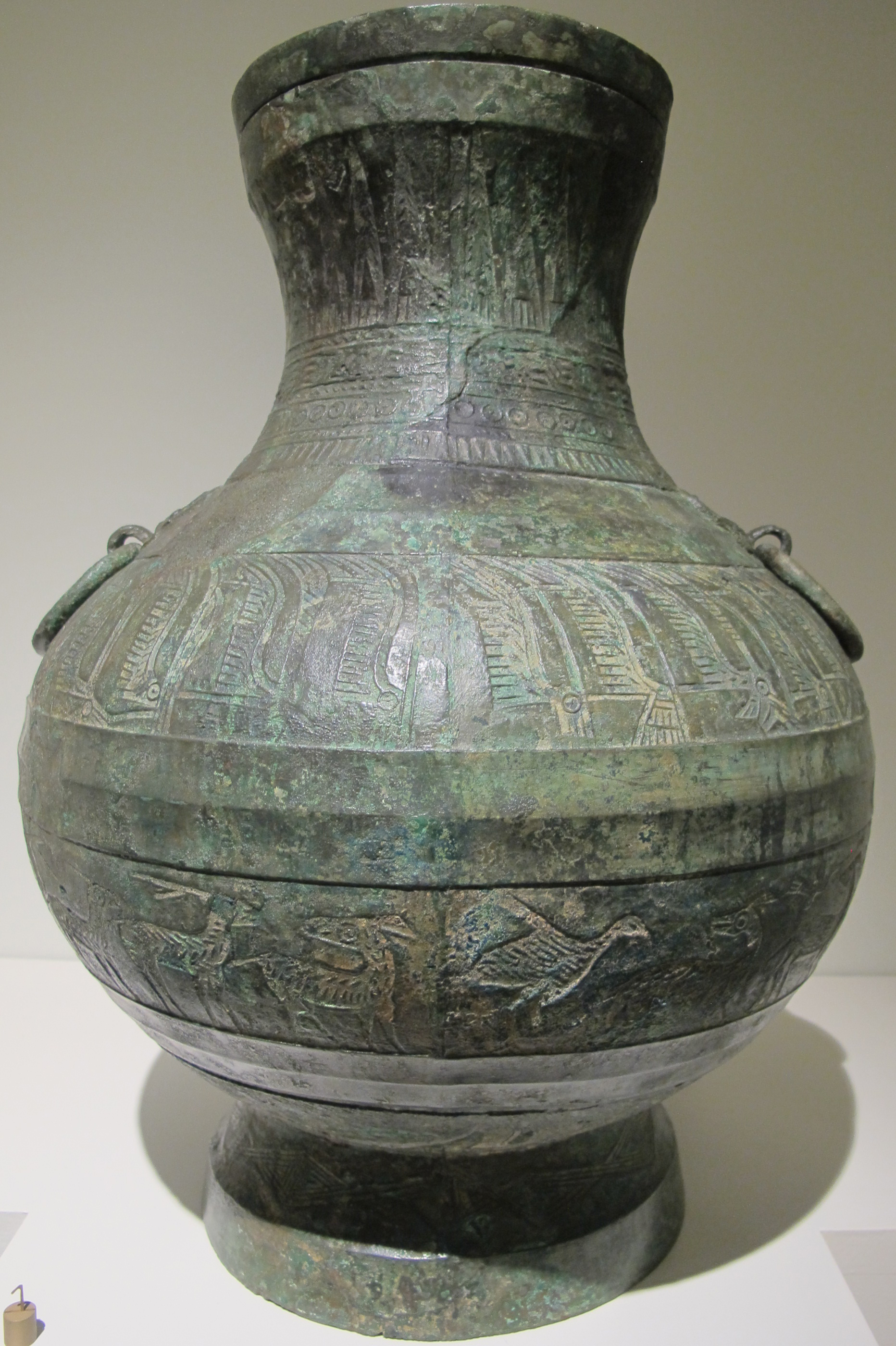
Dongsonian bronze vase, 1st century CE

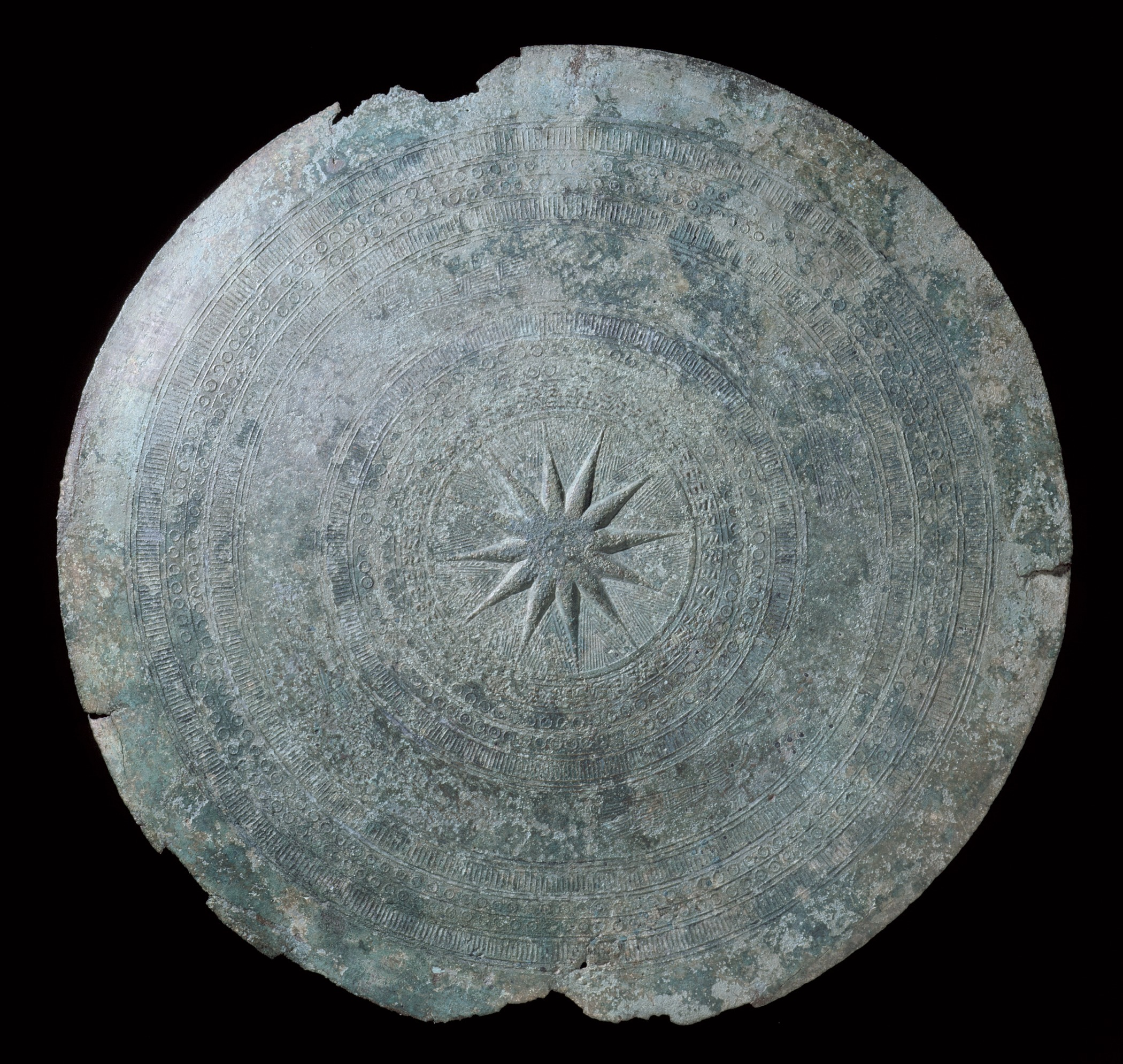
Surface of a Dongsonian bronze drum, 5th-4th century BCE

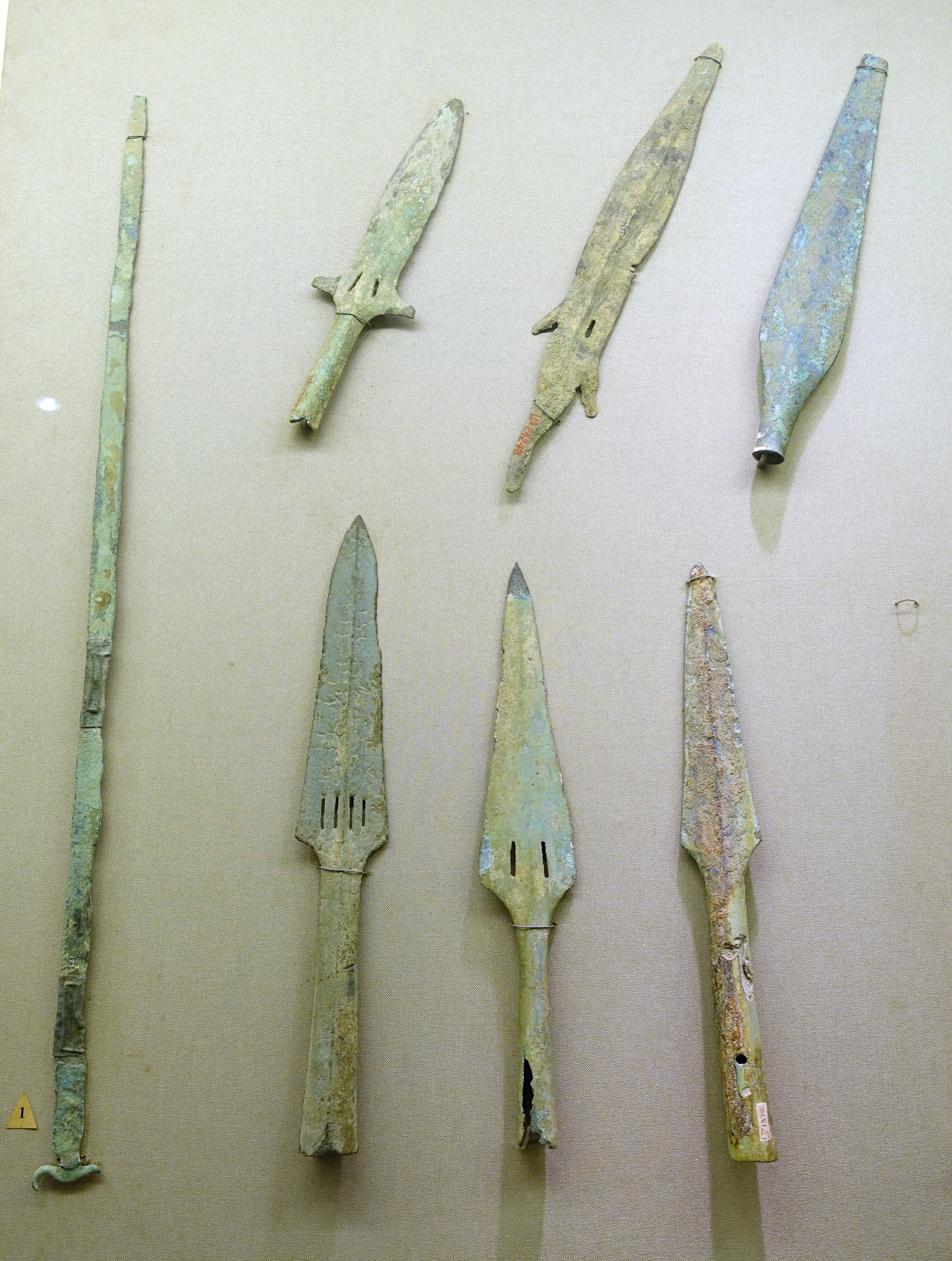
Dongsonian bronze spearheads, 2nd century BCE

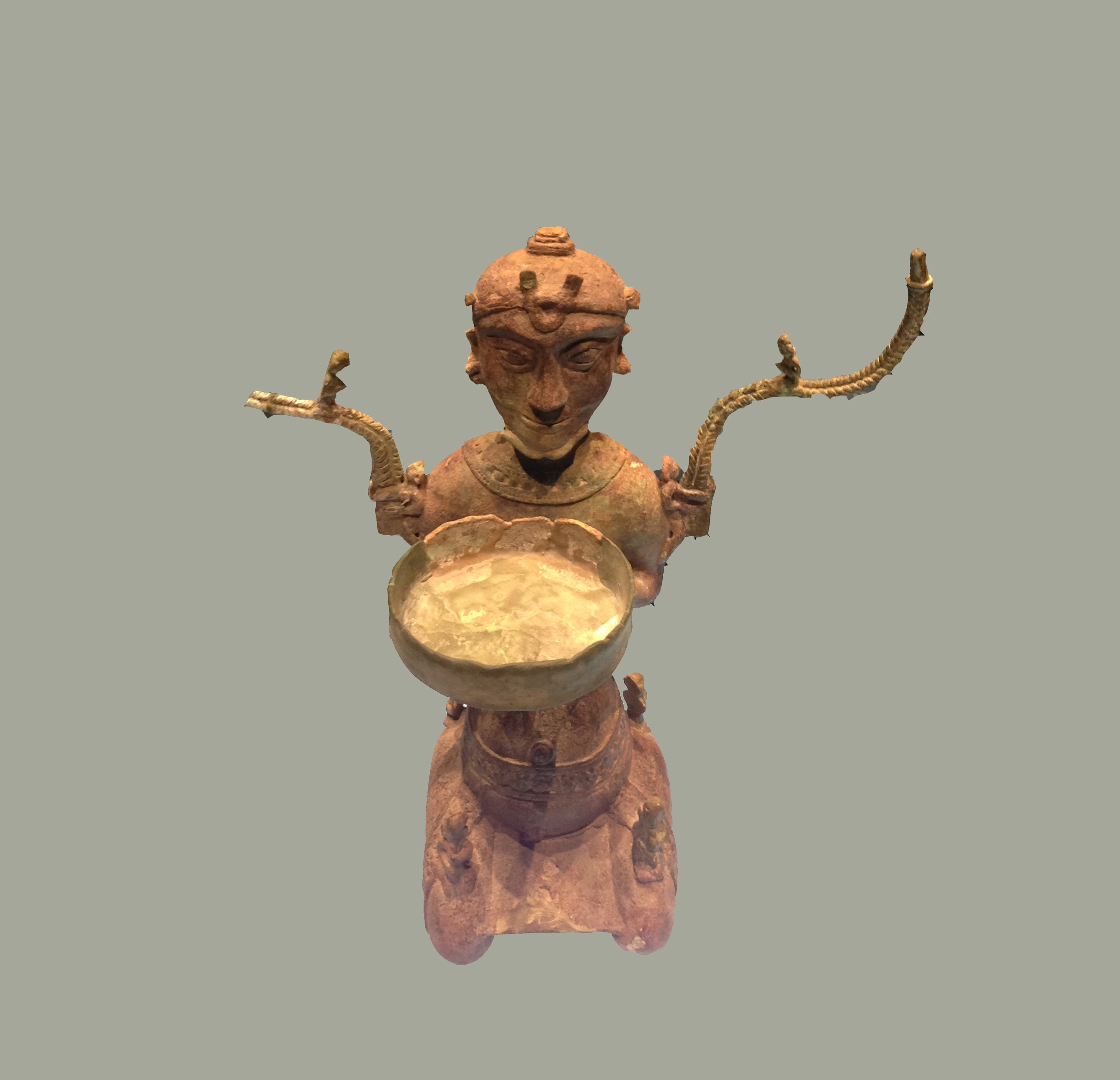
Bronze Lamp in the Shape of a Kneeling Man, 3rd century BCE

According to a Vietnamese legend which first appeared in the 14th century book Lĩnh nam chích quái, the tribal chief Lộc Tục (c. 2919 – 2794 BCE) proclaimed himself as Kinh Dương Vương and founded the state of Xích Quỷ in 2879 BCE, marking the beginning of the Hồng Bàng dynastic period. However, modern Vietnamese historians assume that statehood was only developed in the Red River Delta by the second half of 1st millennium BCE. Kinh Dương Vương was succeeded by Sùng Lãm (popularly known as Lạc Long Quân, c. 2825 BCE – 2525 BCE). The next royal dynasty produced 18 monarchs, known as the Hùng Kings, who renamed their country Văn Lang. The administrative system includes offices like military chief (lạc tướng), paladin (lạc hầu) and mandarin (bố chính). Great numbers of metal weapons and tools excavated at various Phung Nguyen culture sites in northern Indochina are associated with the beginning of the Copper Age in Southeast Asia. Furthermore, the beginning of the Bronze Age has been verified for around 500 BCE at Đông Sơn. Vietnamese historians usually attribute the Đông Sơn culture with the kingdoms of Văn Lang, Âu Lạc, and the Hồng Bàng dynasty. The local Lạc Việt community had developed a highly sophisticated industry of quality bronze production, processing and the manufacturing of tools, weapons and exquisite Bronze drums. Certainly of symbolic value, they were intended to be used for religious or ceremonial purposes. The craftsmen of these objects required refined skills in melting techniques, in the lost-wax casting technique and acquired master skills of composition and execution for the elaborate engravings.

The Legend of Thánh Gióng tells of a youth, who leads the Văn Lang kingdom to victory against the Ân invaders from the north, saves the country and goes straight to heaven. He wears iron armor, rides an armored horse and wields an iron sword. The image implies a society of a certain sophistication in metallurgy as well as An Dương Vương's Legend of the Magic Crossbow, a weapon, that can fire thousands of bolts simultaneously, seems to hint at the extensive use of archery in warfare. The about 1,000 traditional craft villages of the Hồng River Delta near and around Hanoi represented throughout more than 2,000 years of Vietnamese history the national industrial and economic backbone. Countless, mostly small family run manufacturers have over the centuries preserved their ethnic ideas by producing highly sophisticated goods, built temples and dedicated ceremonies and festivals in an unbroken culture of veneration for these legendary popular spirits.

=== Âu Lạc kingdom (257–179 BCE) ===
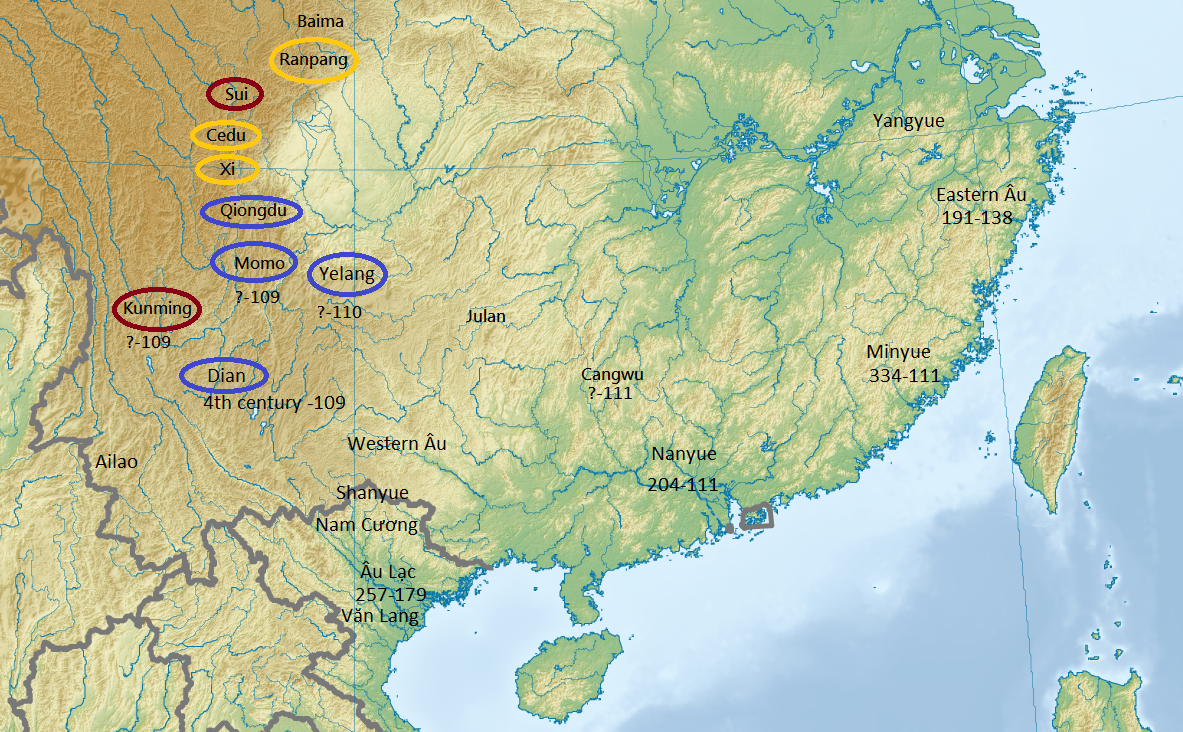
Situation of ancient tribes in Southern China and Northern Vietnam mentioned in Chinese records

By the 3rd century BCE, another Viet group, the Âu Việt, emigrated from modern-day southern China to the Hồng River delta and mixed with the indigenous Văn Lang population. In 257 BCE, a new kingdom, Âu Lạc, emerged as the union of the Âu Việt and the Lạc Việt, with Thục Phán proclaiming himself "An Dương Vương" ("King An Dương"). Some modern Vietnamese believe that Thục Phán came upon the Âu Việt territory (modern-day northernmost Vietnam, western Guangdong, and southern Guangxi province, with its capital in what is today Cao Bằng Province).

=== Nanyue (179 BCE–111 BCE) ===
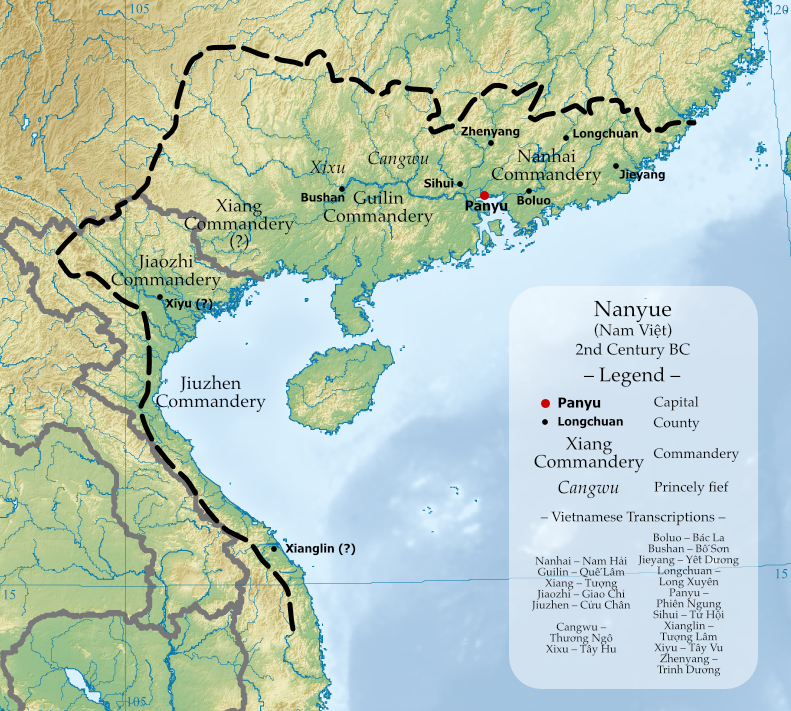
Nanyue or Nam Việt (204 BCE – 111 BCE) — an ancient kingdom that consisted of parts of the modern southern Chinese provinces of Guangdong, Guangxi, and Yunnan and northern Vietnam

In 207 BCE, the former Qin general Zhao Tuo (Triệu Đà in Vietnamese) established an independent kingdom in the modern-day Guangdong/Guangxi area of China's southern coast. He proclaimed his new kingdom as Nam Việt (pinyin: Nanyue), to be ruled by the Zhao dynasty. Zhao Tuo later appointed himself a commandant of central Guangdong, closing the borders and conquering neighboring districts and titled himself "King of Nanyue". In 179 BCE, he defeated King An Dương and annexed Âu Lạc.

The period has been given some controversial conclusions by Vietnamese historians, as some consider Zhao's rule as the starting point of the Chinese domination, since Zhao Tuo was a former Qin general; whereas others consider it still an era of Vietnamese independence as the Zhao family in Nanyue were assimilated into local culture. They ruled independently of what then constituted the Han Empire. At one point, Zhao Tuo even declared himself Emperor, equal to the Han Emperor in the north.

== Chinese Domination (111 BCE–938 CE) ==
=== First Era of Northern Domination (111 BCE–40 CE) ===
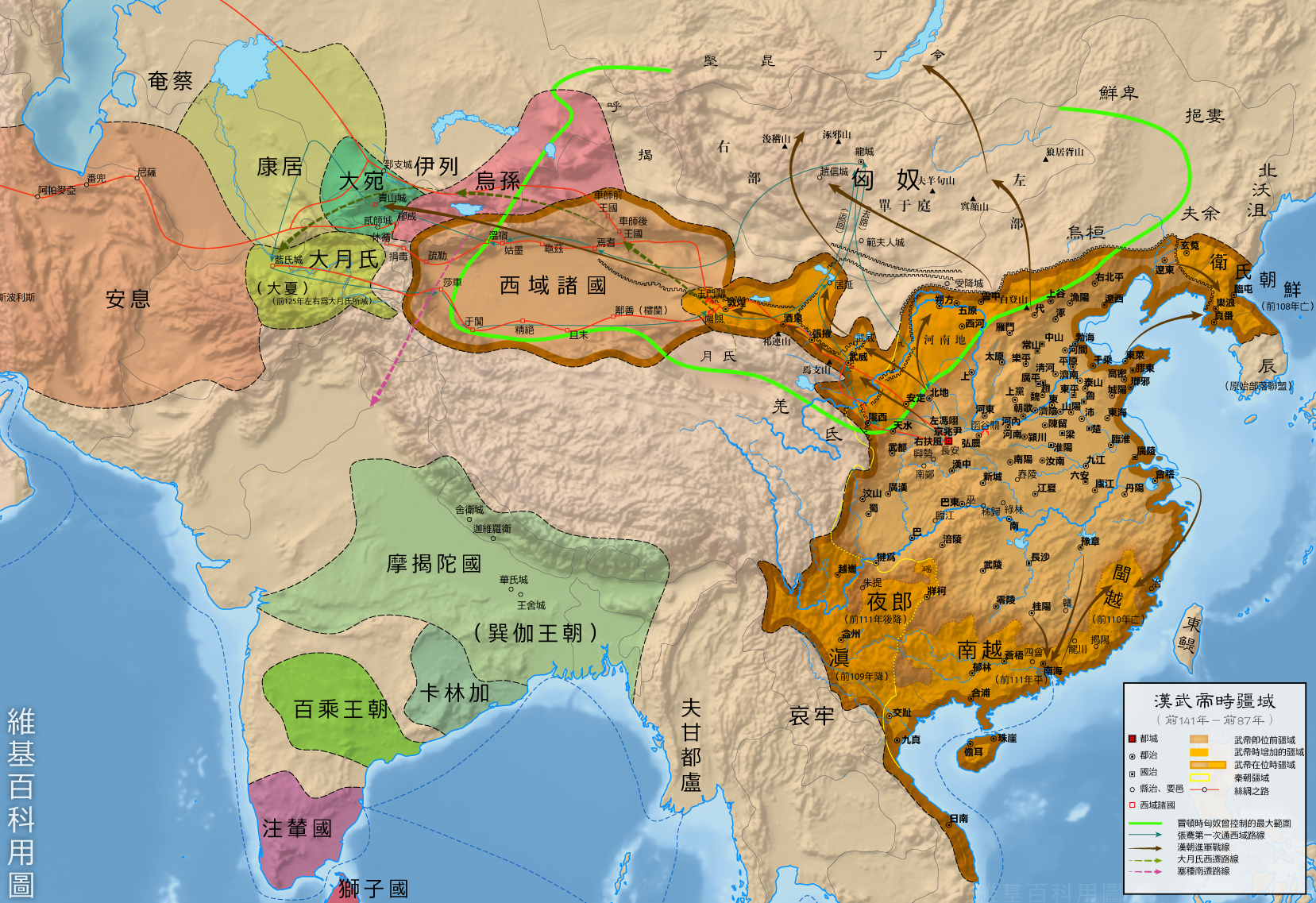
Northern and Central Vietnam under Chinese rule during the reign of Emperor Wu of Han

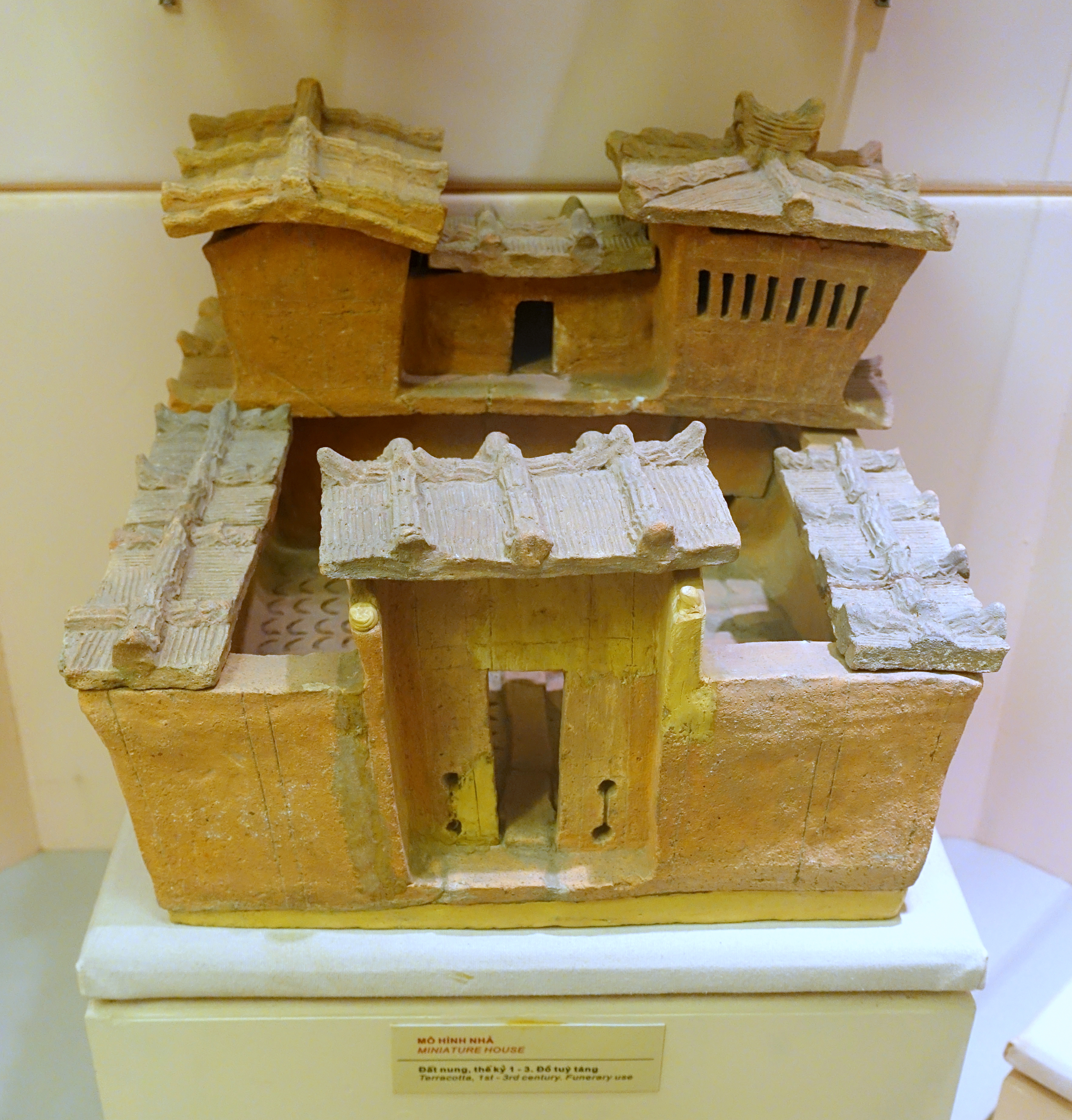
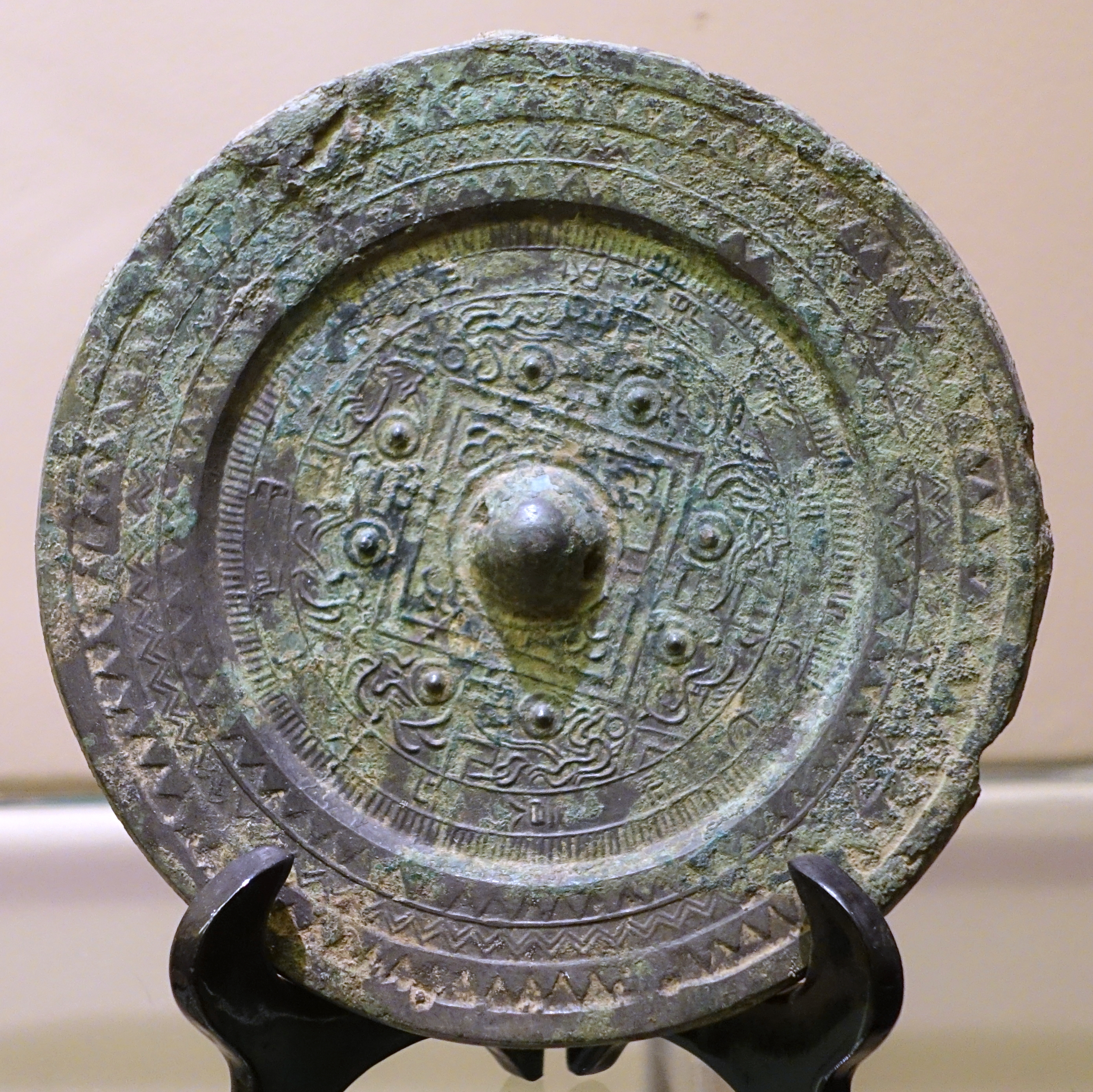
Left image: Han terracotta miniature house for funerary use, Northern Vietnam, 1st-3rd century CE
Right image: Han–Viet bronze mirror, 2nd-3rd century CE

In 111 BCE, the Chinese Han dynasty conquered Nanyue and established its new territories, dividing Vietnam into Giao Chỉ (pinyin: Jiaozhi), i.e. the Red River Delta; Cửu Chân from Thanh Hóa to Hà Tĩnh; and Nhật Nam (pinyin: Rinan), from Quảng Bình to Huế. While governors and top officials were Chinese, the original Vietnamese nobles (Lạc Hầu, Lạc Tướng) from the Hồng Bàng period still managed in some of the highlands. During this period, Buddhism was introduced into Vietnam from India via the Maritime Silk Road, while Taoism and Confucianism spread to Vietnam through the Chinese rulers.

=== Trưng Sisters' rebellion (40–43) ===
In February 40 CE, the Trưng Sisters led a successful revolt against Han Governor Su Ding (Vietnamese: Tô Định) and recaptured 65 states (including modern Guangxi). Trưng Trắc, angered by the killing of her husband by Su Dung, led the revolt together with her sister, Trưng Nhị. Trưng Trắc later became the Queen (Trưng Nữ Vương). In 43 CE, Emperor Guangwu of Han sent his famous general Ma Yuan (Vietnamese: Mã Viện) with a large army (20,000 troops) to quell the revolt. After a long, difficult campaign, Ma Yuan suppressed the uprising and the Trung Sisters committed suicide to avoid capture. To this day, the Trưng Sisters are revered in Vietnam as the national symbol of Vietnamese women.

=== Second Era of Northern Domination (43–544) ===
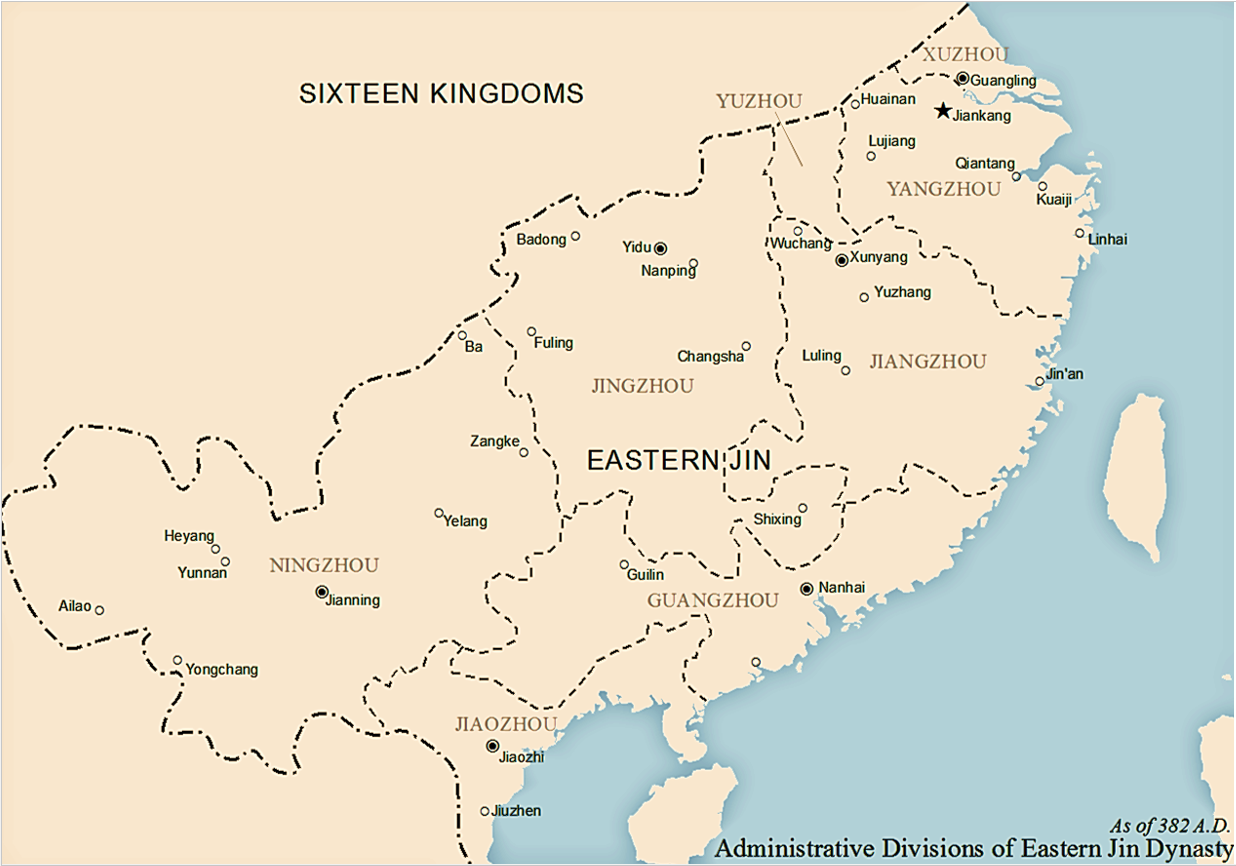
Northern Vietnam under Eastern Jin dynasty, 382 CE

Learning a lesson from the Trưng revolt, the Han and other successful Chinese dynasties took measures to eliminate the power of the Vietnamese nobles. The Vietnamese elites were educated in Chinese culture and politics. During the end of the Han and beginning of the Three Kingdoms era, the Giao Chi prefect Shi Xie professed allegiance to the emperor and then Wu—including sending a son as a hostage to ensure his loyalty—but is regarded by Vietnamese historiography as having been an autonomous warlord, posthumously deified by later Vietnamese monarchs. According to Stephen O'Harrow, Shi Xie was essentially "the first Vietnamese". Upon Shi's death, Wu ordered the separation of Guangzhou as a new province and the replacement of Shi's son as head of Giao Chi. Shi Hui rebelled but aimed for a peaceful resolution once the Wu army arrived. During negotiations, he and most of his brothers were executed and the remainder of his family demoted to common status. In 248 a Yue woman, Triệu Thị Trinh (popularly known as Lady Triệu, or Bà Triệu), led a revolt with her brother Triệu Quốc Đạt against the Wu Kingdom. Once again, the uprising failed. Eastern Wu sent Lu Yin and 8,000 elite soldiers to suppress the rebels. He managed to pacify the rebels with a combination of threats and persuasion. According to the Đại Việt sử ký toàn thư (Complete Annals of Đại Việt), Lady Triệu had long hair that reached her shoulders and rode into battle on an elephant. After several months of warfare she was defeated and committed suicide. A more successful revolt occurred in the mid-260s when the county official Lü Xing (呂興) overthrew the rest of the Wu administration and reached out to Wei's governor of recently conquered Shu. Wei and its successor state Jin held Giao Chi from 266 to 271, when Wu's Jiaozhi Campaign finally reconquered the area. It returned to Jin's control, however, following its complete annexation of Wu, ending the Three Kingdoms period.

=== Early Cham kingdoms (192–7th century) ===
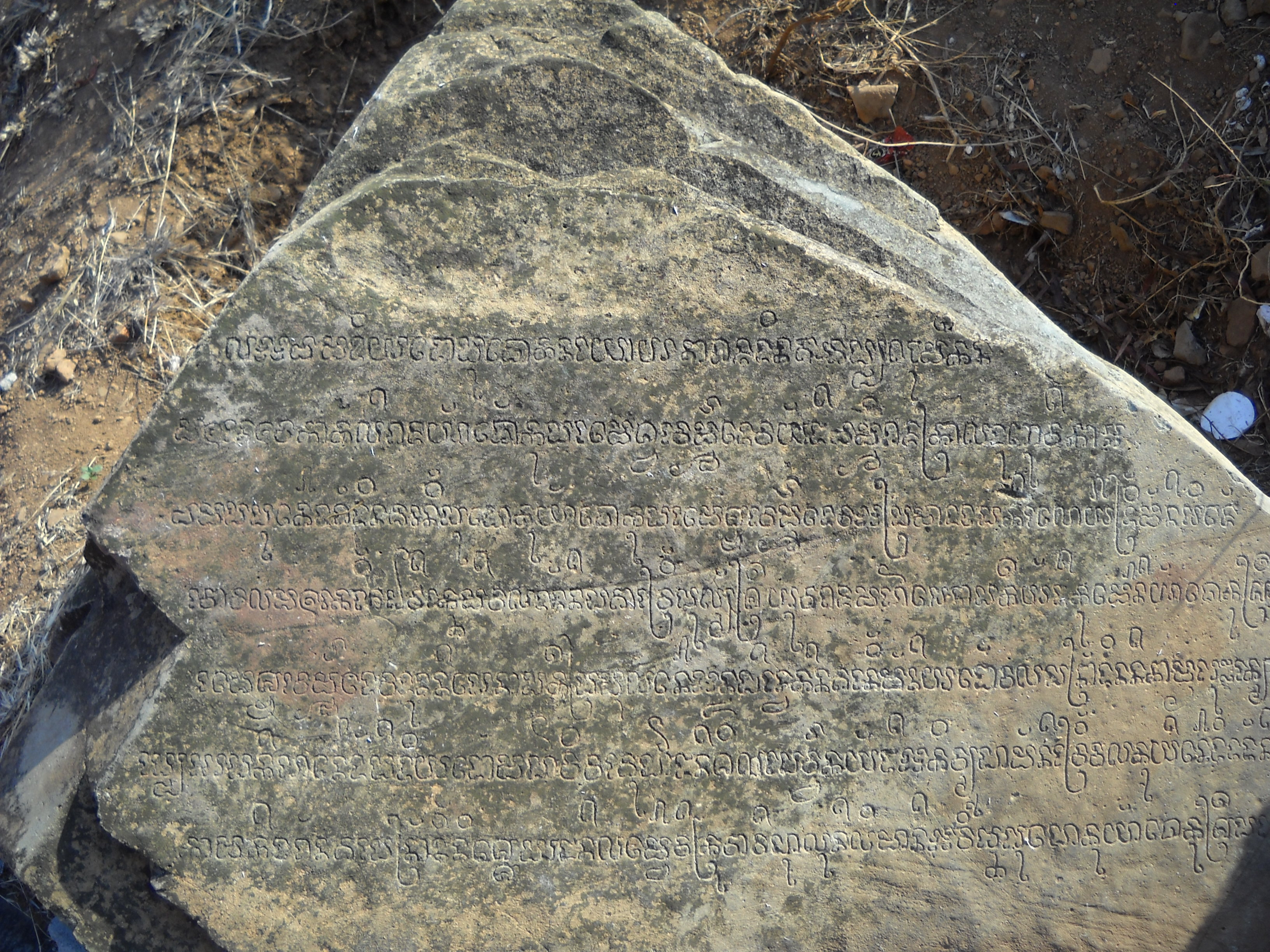
Inscription from the Cham temple at Po Klong Garai

At the same time, in present-day Central Vietnam, there was a successful revolt of the Cham people in 192. Chinese dynasties called it Lin-Yi (Lin village; Vietnamese: Lâm Ấp). It later became a powerful kingdom, Champa, stretching from Quảng Bình to Phan Thiết (Bình Thuận). The Cham developed the first native writing system in Southeast Asia, oldest surviving literature of any Southeast Asian language, leading Buddhist, Hindu, and cultural expertise in the region.

=== Kingdom of Funan (1st century–627) ===
In the early first century CE, on the lower Mekong, the first Indianized kingdom of Southeast Asia which the Chinese called them Funan emerged and became the great economic power in the region, its prime city Óc Eo attracted merchants and craftmen from China, India, and even Rome. The first ruler of Funan, Queen Liǔyè, got married with Kaundinya, a man from the west with a magic bow. Kaundinya then became the ruler of Funan. Funan is said to be the first Khmer state, or Austronesian, or multiethnic. According to Chinese annals, the last king of Funan, Rudravarman (r. 514–545) sent many embassies to China. Also according to Chinese annals, Funan might have been conquered by another kingdom called Zhenla around 627, ending the kingdom of Funan.

=== Kingdom of Vạn Xuân (544–602) ===
In the period between the beginning of the Chinese Age of Fragmentation and the beginning of the Sui dynasty, several revolts against Chinese rule took place, such as those of Lý Bôn and his general and heir Triệu Quang Phục. All of them ultimately failed, yet most notable were those led by Lý Bôn and Triệu Quang Phục, who ruled the briefly independent Vạn Xuân kingdom for almost half a century, from 544 to 602, before Sui China reconquered the kingdom.

=== Golden Age of Cham Civilization and wars with Angkor Empire (7th century–1203) ===
Champa from 7th to 13th century

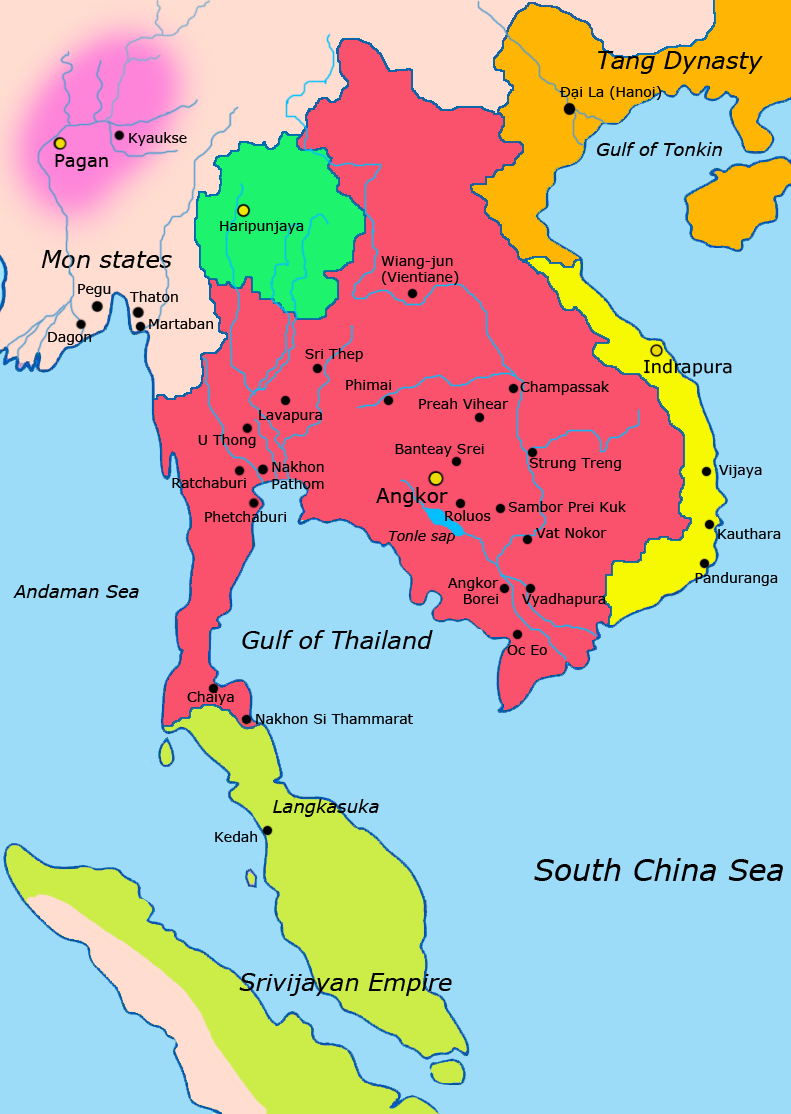
Champa and the region during the 9th century

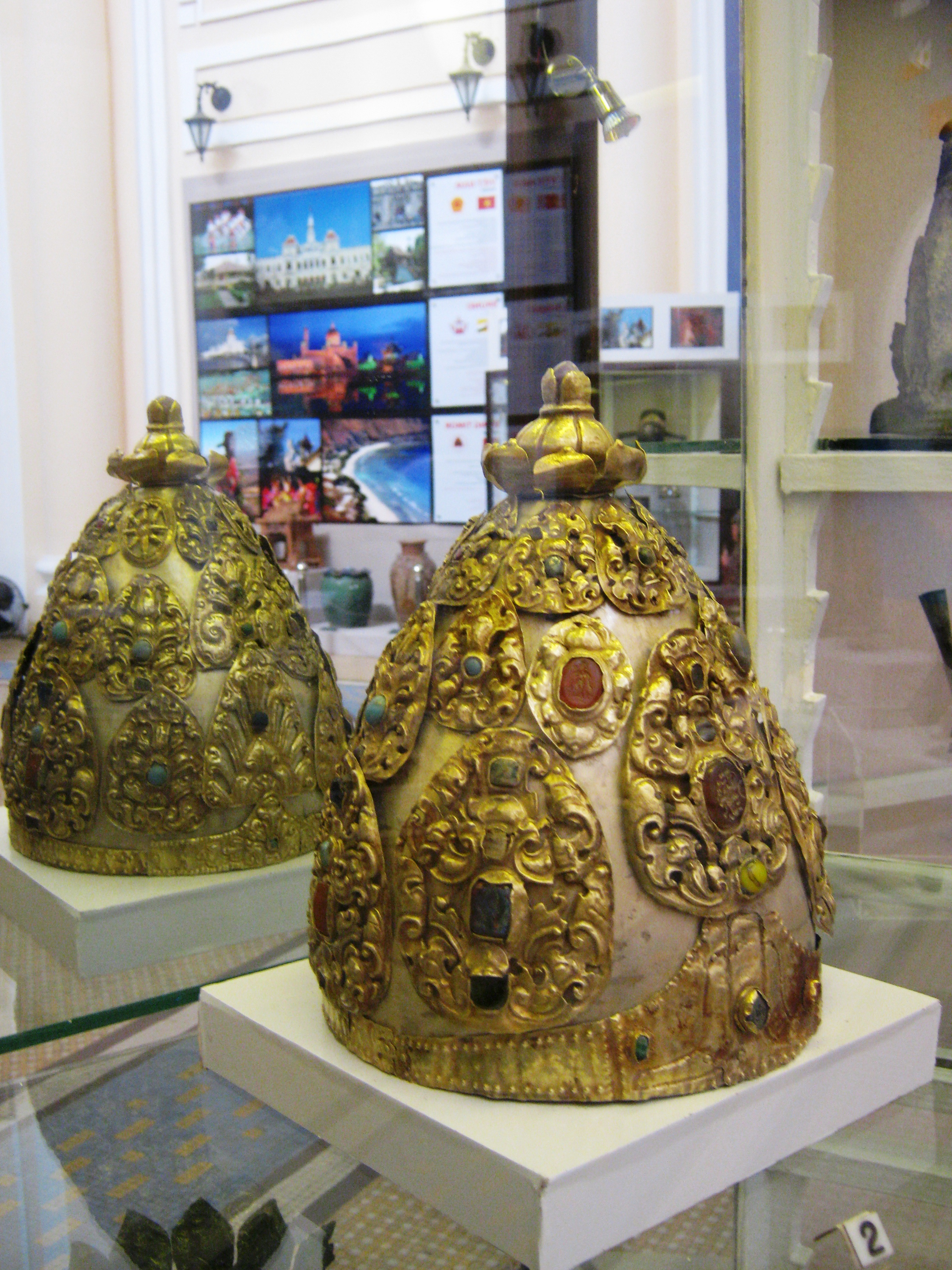
Crown of Champa (7th–8th century)

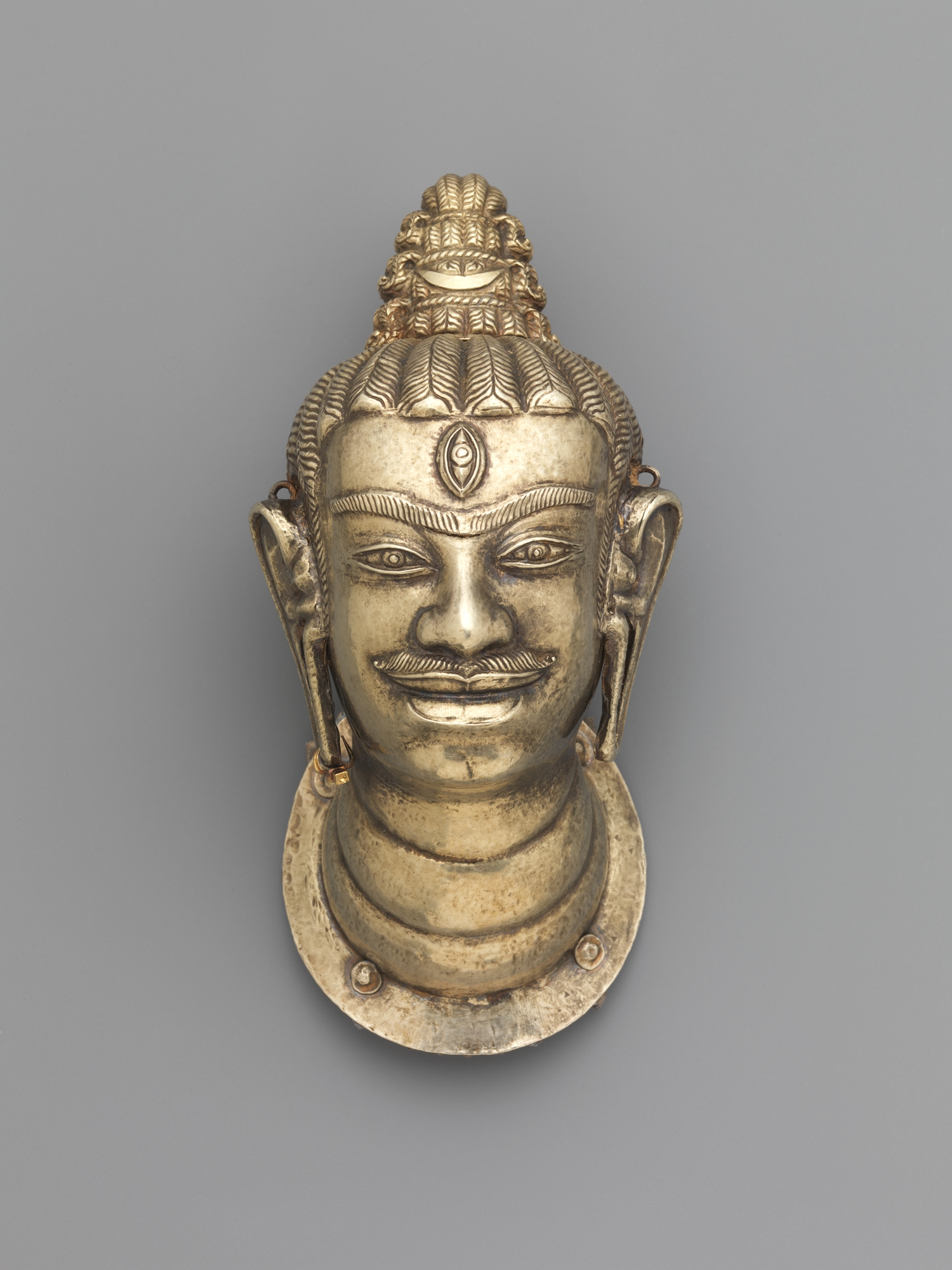
Head of Shiva made of gold-silver alloy (10th century)

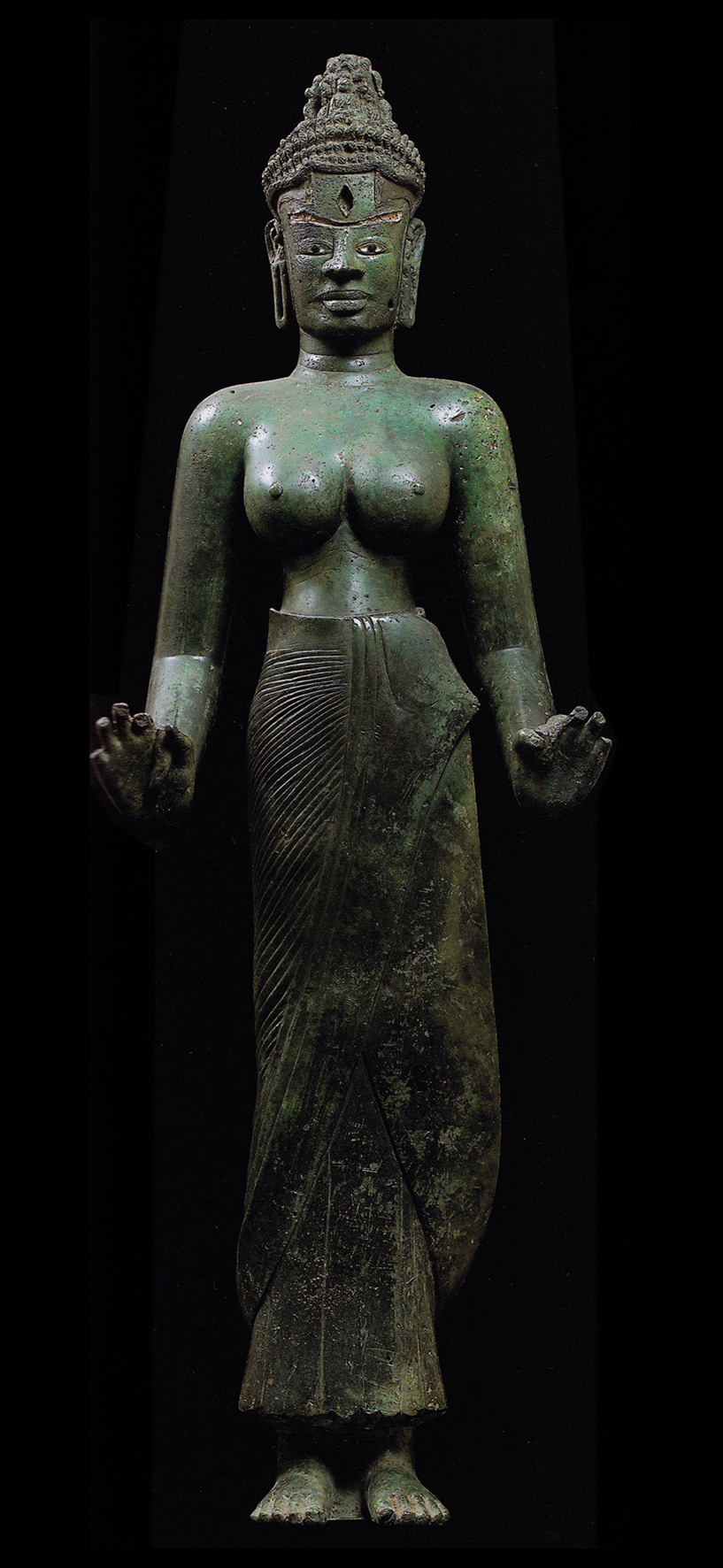
Dong Duong Bodhisattva sculpture (9th century)

The Cham Lâm Ấp kingdom, with capital located in Simhapura, became prosperous through benefiting from the ancient maritime trade routes from the Middle East to China. The wealthy of Lâm Ấp attracted attention from the Chinese Empire. In 605, emperor Yang Guang of the Sui Empire ordered general Liu Fang, who had just reconquered and pacificed northern Vietnam, to invade Lâm Ấp. The kingdom was quickly overwhelmed by the invaders who pillaged and looted Cham sanctuaries. Despite that, king Sambhuvarman of Lâm Ấp (r. 572–629) quickly reasserted his independence, beginning the unified period of Champa in 629.

From the 7th to the 10th centuries, the Cham controlled the trade in spices and silk between China, India, the Indonesian islands, and the Abbasid empire in Baghdad. They supplemented their income from the trade routes not only by exporting ivory and aloe, but also by engaging in piracy and raiding. This period of prosperity and cultural flourishing is often referred to as the golden age of Champa.

In 875, a new Mahayana Buddhist monarch named Indravarman II (r. 854–893) founded a new dynasty with Buddhism as state religion. Indravarman II built a new capital city in Indrapura (modern-day Quảng Nam) and a large Buddhist temple in Dong Duong. The dynasty of Indravarman II continued to rule until the late 10th century, when a Vietnamese invasion in 982 murdered the ruling king Jaya Paramesvaravarman I (r. 972–982). A Vietnamese usurper named Lưu Kế Tông took advance of unsettling situation and seized Indrapura in 983, declared himself the king of Champa in 986, disrupted the Cham kingdom. In Vijaya (present-day Binh Dinh) from the south, a new Hindu dynasty was founded in 989 and relocated Cham capital to Vijaya in 1000.

Champa and the emerging Khmer Empire had waged war on each other for three centuries, from the 10th to 13th century. The Khmer first invaded Champa in Kauthara (Khanh Hoa) in 950. In 1080, they attacked Vijaya and central Champa. The Cham under Harivarman IV launched counteroffensive against the Cambodian and plundered temples across east of the Mekong river. Tensions escalated during the next century. Suryavarman II of Khmer Empire invaded Champa in 1145 and 1149 after Cham ruler Indravarman refused to join with the Khmer campaign against the Vietnamese. It was believed that Suryavarman II died during the war against Champa in 1150. In 1177 Cham king Jaya Indravarman IV led a surprised attacked on Khmer capital Yasodharapura (Angkor) and defeated them at the Battle of Tonlé Sap.

The new Cambodian ruler, Jayavarman VII, arose to power, repelled the Cham and began his conquest of Champa in 1190. He finally defeated the Cham in 1203 and put Champa under Khmer governance for 17 years. In 1220, as the Khmer voluntary withdraw from Champa, a Cham prince named Angsaraja proclaimed Jaya Paramesvaravarman II of Champa and restored Cham independence.

Champa expanded its commerce to the Philippines in the 1200s. The History of Song notes that to the east of Champa through a two-day journey lay the country of Ma-i, at Mindoro, Philippines; while Pu-duan (Butuan) at Mindanao, need a seven-day journey, and there were mentions of Cham commercial activities in Butuan. Butuan resented Champa commercial supremacy and their king, Rajah Kiling spearheaded a diplomatic rivalry for China trade against Champa hegemony. Meanwhile, at the nation of the future Sultanate of Sulu which by then was still Hindu, there was a mass migration of men from Champa and they were locally known as Orang Dampuan, and they caused conflicts (which were then resolved) with the local Sulu people. They became the ancestors of the local Yakan people. Immigration and trade wasn't one way though as there were also Filipinos who ended up in Champa.

=== Third Era of Northern Domination: Sui and Tang rules (602–905) ===
Vietnam under the Chinese Tang dynasty, c. 700

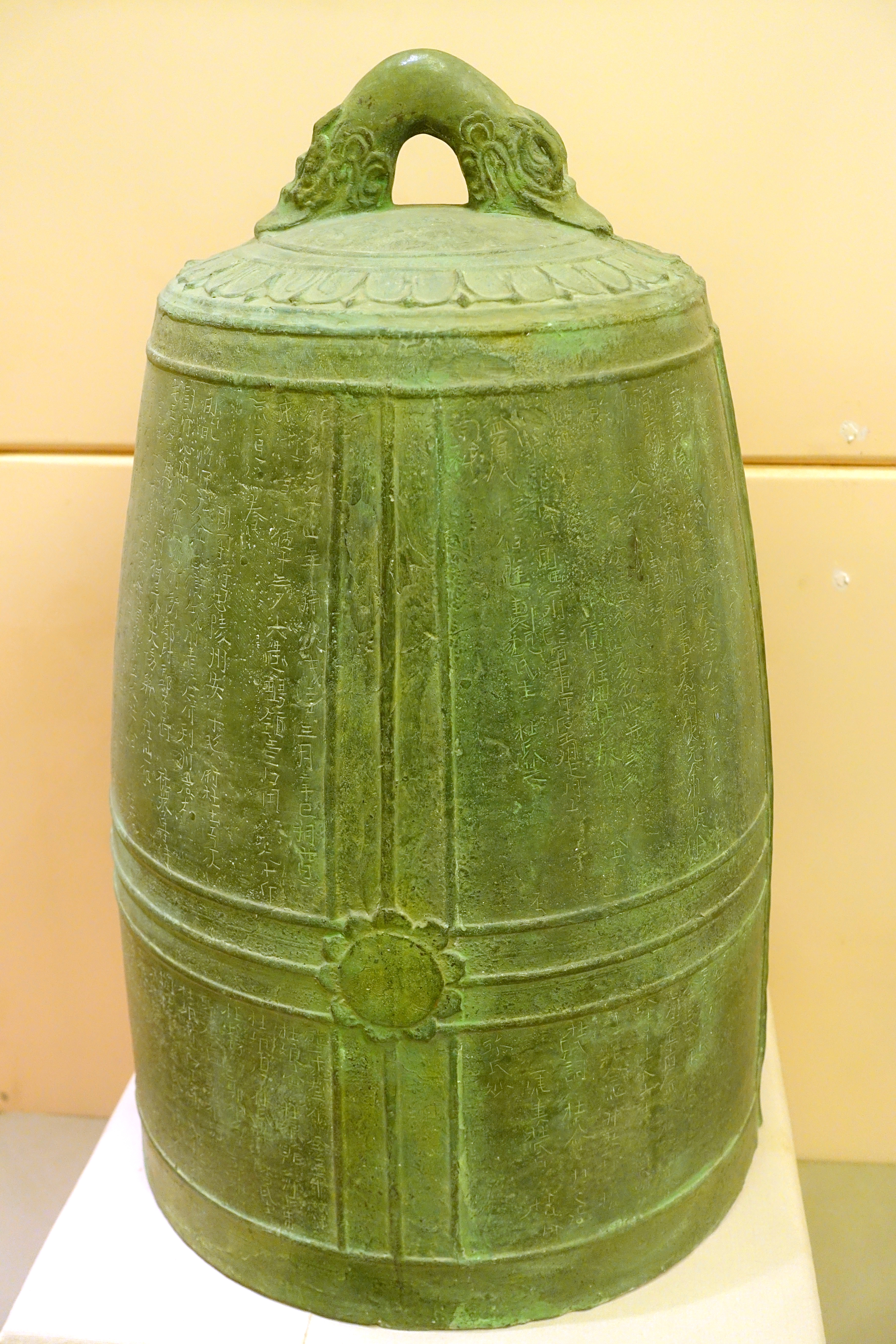
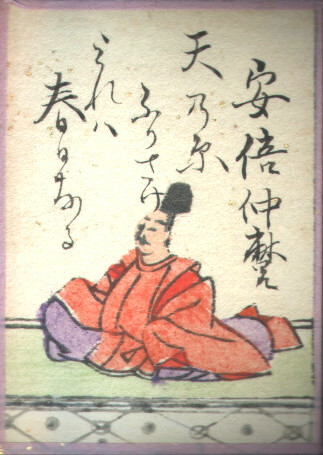
Left image: Replica of Thanh Mai bronze bell, 798 CE
Right image: Abe no Nakamaro, a Japanese who served as Tang governor of Annam in 761–767

During the Tang dynasty, Vietnam was called Annam until 866. With its capital around Bắc Ninh, Annam became a flourishing trading outpost, receiving goods from the southern seas. The Book of the Later Han recorded that in 166 the first envoy from the Roman Empire to China arrived by this route, and merchants were soon to follow. The 3rd-century Tales of Wei (Weilüe) mentioned a "water route" (the Red River) from Annam into what is now southern Yunnan. From there, goods were taken over land to the rest of China via the regions of modern Kunming and Chengdu. The capital of Annam, Tống Bình or Songping (today Hanoi) was a major urbanized settlement in the southwest region of Tang Empire. From 858 to 864, disturbances in Annan gave Nanzhao, a Yunnan kingdom, opportunity to intervene the region, provoking local tribes to revolt against the Chinese. The Yunnanese and their local allies launched the Siege of Songping in early 863, defeating the Chinese, and captured the capital in three years. In 866, Chinese jiedushi Gao Pian recaptured the city and drove out the Nanzhao army. He renamed the city to Daluocheng (大羅城, Đại La thành).

In 866, Annan was renamed Tĩnh Hải quân. Early in the 10th century, as China became politically fragmented, successive lords from the Khúc clan, followed by Dương Đình Nghệ, ruled Tĩnh Hải quân autonomously under the Tang title of Jiedushi (Vietnamese: Tiết Độ Sứ), (governor), but stopped short of proclaiming themselves kings.

=== Autonomous era (905–938) ===
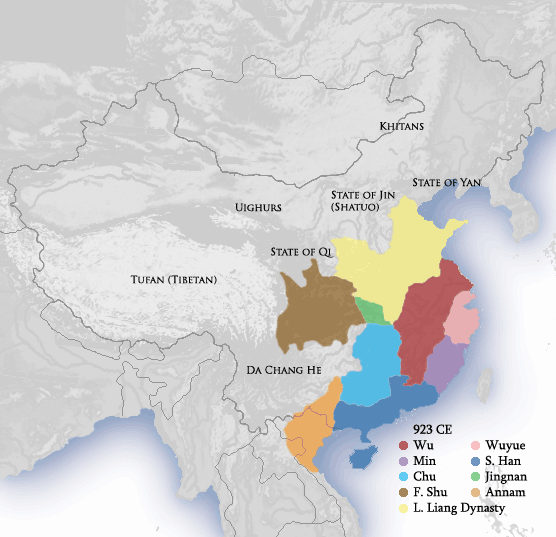
Khúc clan (orange), 923 CE

Since 905, Tĩnh Hải circuit had been ruled by local Vietnamese governors like an autonomous state. Tĩnh Hải circuit had to paid tributes for Later Liang dynasty to exchange political protection. In 923, the nearby Southern Han invaded Tĩnh Hải but was repelled by Vietnamese leader Dương Đình Nghệ. In 938, the Chinese state Southern Han once again sent a fleet to subdue the Vietnamese. General Ngô Quyền (r. 939–944), Dương Đình Nghệ's son-in-law, defeated the Southern Han fleet at the Battle of Bạch Đằng (938). He then proclaimed himself King Ngô, established a monarchy government in Cổ Loa and effectively began the age of independence for Vietnam.

== Dynastic period (939–1945) ==
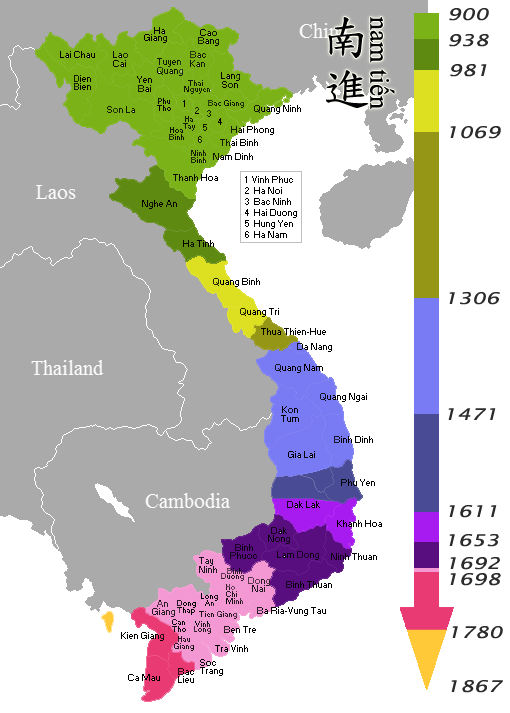
Map of Vietnam showing its territorial expansions, 11th to 19th century

Using Chinese characters and references to Chinese sources, Đại Việt kings reinforced royal legitimacy, representing themselves as Han rulers of their kingdom and 'sons of heaven', on par with Chinese culture, statecraft, and antiquity. From the tenth to the thirteenth centuries, the Lý dynasty consolidated authority while maintaining a tributary yet autonomous relationship with the Song dynasty. The succeeding Trần dynasty strengthened dynastic cohesion and repelled invasions from the Mongol. In the fifteenth century, after a brief occupation by the Ming dynasty, independence was restored under the Lê dynasty, which promoted Confucian governance and territorial expansion. Political fragmentation followed in the seventeenth and eighteenth centuries as rival regimes ruled the North (Đàng Ngoài) and South (Đàng Trong), until the Nguyễn dynasty unified the country in the nineteenth century before colonial incorporation into French Indochina and the eventual end of the monarchy.

Literacy largely remained the preserve of the upper classes. Initially, writing was conducted exclusively in chữ Hán, but by the 13th century a derivative script known as chữ Nôm had emerged, enabling the writing of native Vietnamese words. However, it remained limited to poetry, literature, and practical texts like medicine while all state and official documents were written in Classical Chinese. Aside from some mining and fishing, agriculture was the primary activity of most Vietnamese, and economic development and trade were not promoted or encouraged by the state.

=== Ngô, Đinh, and Anterior Lê dynasties (939–1009) ===
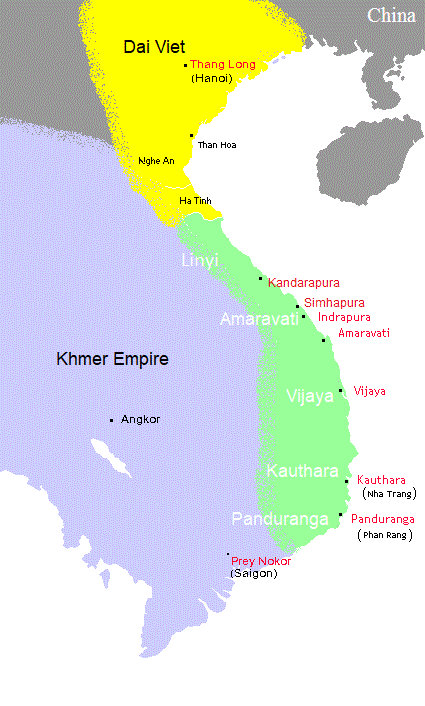
Indochina c. 1010 AD. Đại Việt territory marked as yellow, Champa polities in green and the Khmer Empire in purple

Ngô Quyền in 939 declared himself king, but died after only 6 years. His untimely death after a short reign resulted in a power struggle for the throne, resulting in the country's first major civil war, the upheaval of the Twelve Warlords (Loạn Thập Nhị Sứ Quân). The war lasted from 944 to 968, until the clan led by Đinh Bộ Lĩnh defeated the other warlords, unifying the country. Đinh Bộ Lĩnh founded the Đinh dynasty in 968 and proclaimed himself Đinh Tiên Hoàng (Đinh the Majestic Emperor) and renamed the country from Tĩnh Hải quân to Đại Cồ Việt (literally "Great Viet"), with its capital in the city of Hoa Lư (Ninh Bình Province). In relations with China since Đinh Bộ Lĩnh, Vietnamese dynasties had considered their leaders "kings" although they had still implicitly considered their leaders emperors.

In 979, Emperor Đinh Tiên Hoàng and his crown prince Đinh Liễn were assassinated by Đỗ Thích, a government official, leaving his lone surviving son, the 6-year-old Đinh Toàn, to assume the throne. Taking advantage of the situation, the Song dynasty invaded Đại Cồ Việt. Facing such a grave threat to national independence, the commander of the armed forces, (Thập Đạo Tướng Quân) Lê Hoàn took the throne, replaced the house of Đinh and established the Anterior Lê dynasty. A capable military tactician, Lê Hoan realized the risks of engaging the mighty Song troops head on; thus, he tricked the invading army into Chi Lăng Pass, then ambushed and killed their commander, quickly ending the threat to his young nation in 981. The Song dynasty withdrew their troops and Lê Hoàn was referred to in his realm as Emperor Đại Hành (Đại Hành Hoàng Đế). Emperor Lê Đại Hành was also the first Vietnamese monarch who began the southward expansion process against the kingdom of Champa.

Emperor Lê Đại Hành's death in 1005 resulted in infighting for the throne amongst his sons. The eventual winner, Lê Long Đĩnh, became the most notorious tyrant in Vietnamese history. He devised sadistic punishments of prisoners for his own entertainment and indulged in deviant sexual activities. Toward the end of his short life – he died at the age of 24 – Lê Long Đĩnh had become so ill that he had to lie down when meeting with his officials in court.

=== Lý dynasty, Trần dynasty and Hồ dynasty (1009–1407) ===
Đại Việt under the Lý and Trần dynasties (1010–1400)

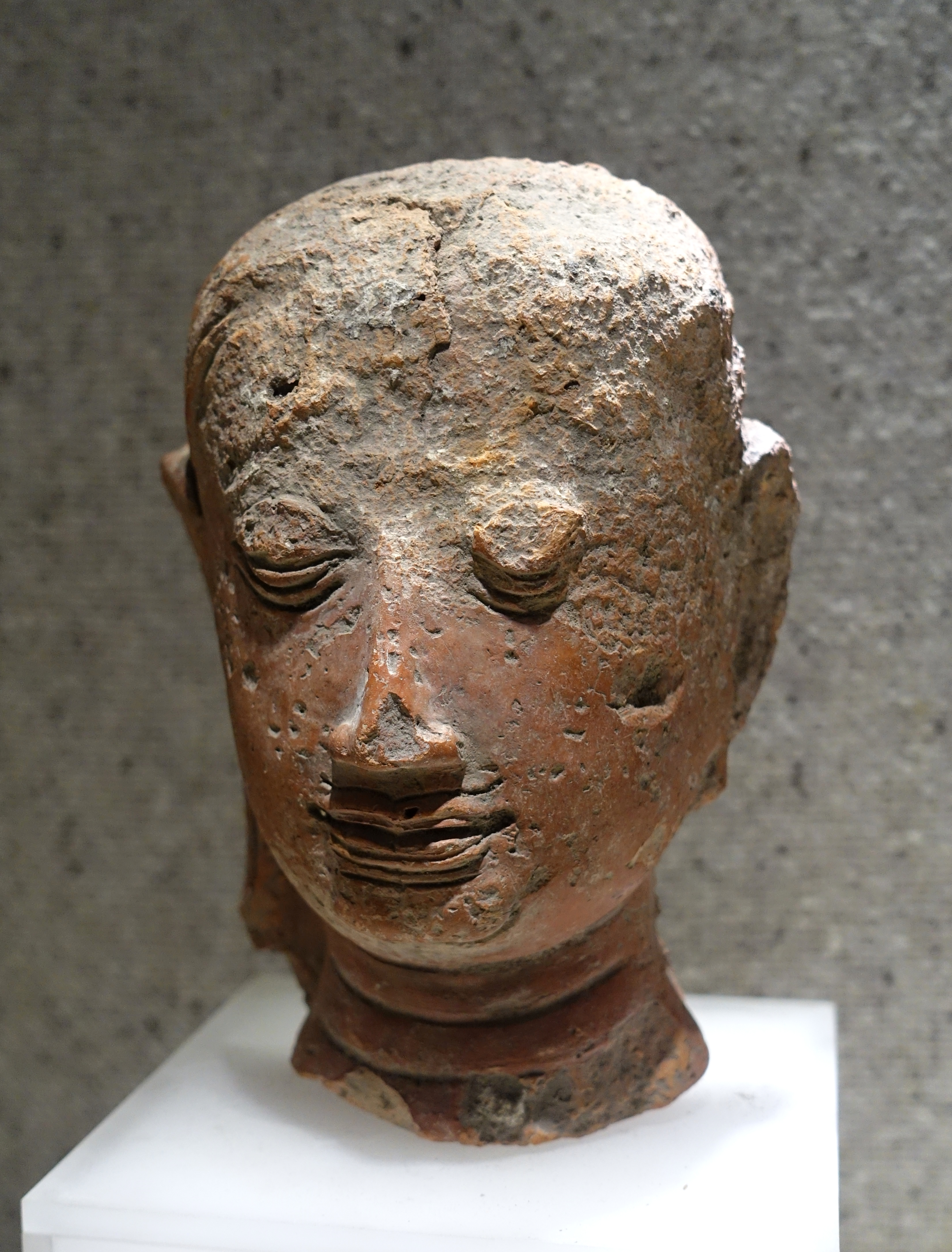
Vietnamese terracotta Buddha head, 11th–14th century

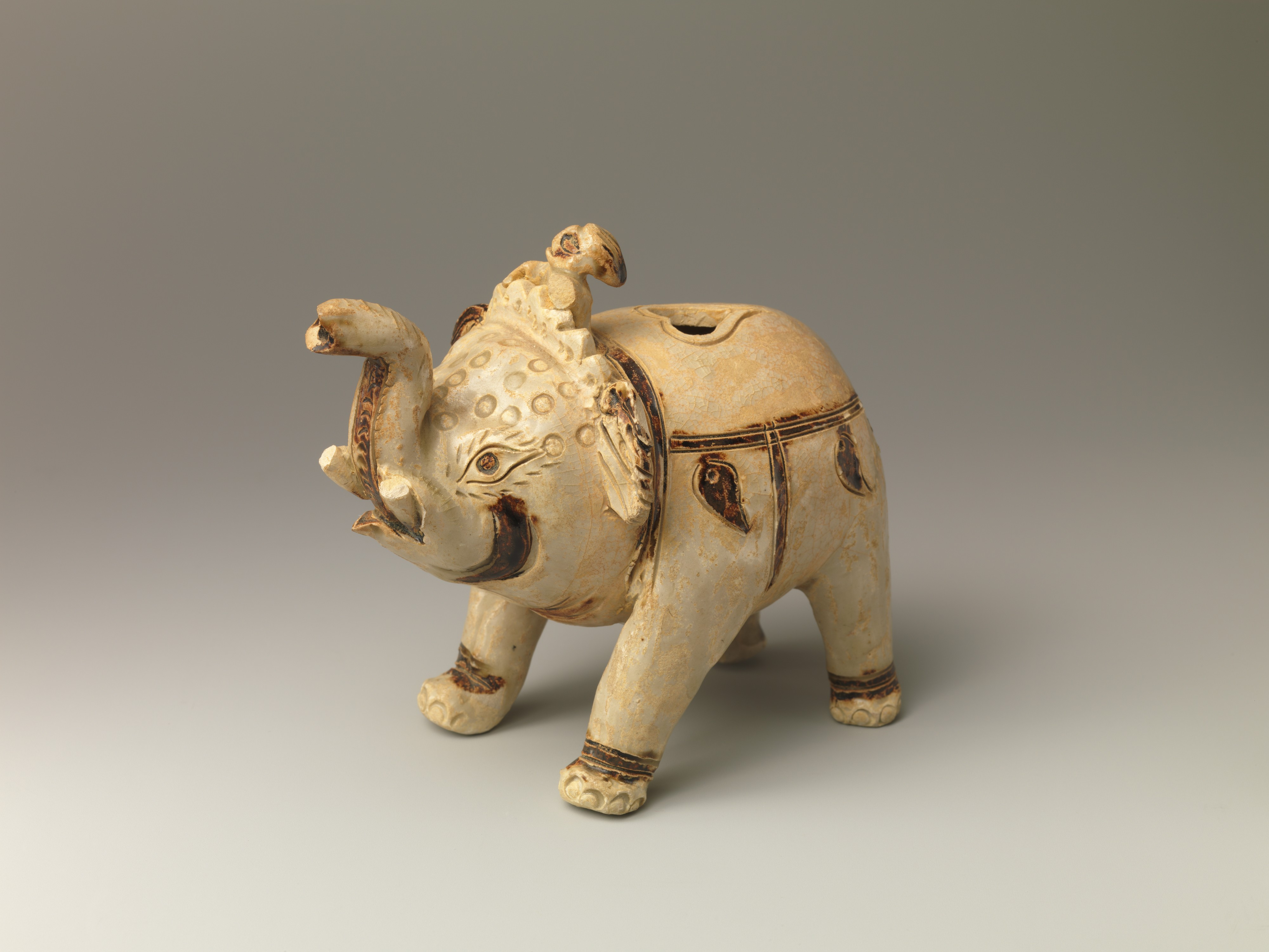
Viet glazed ceramic tea cup in shape of an elephant, Lý dynasty period, 11th–12th century. Metropolitan Museum of Art

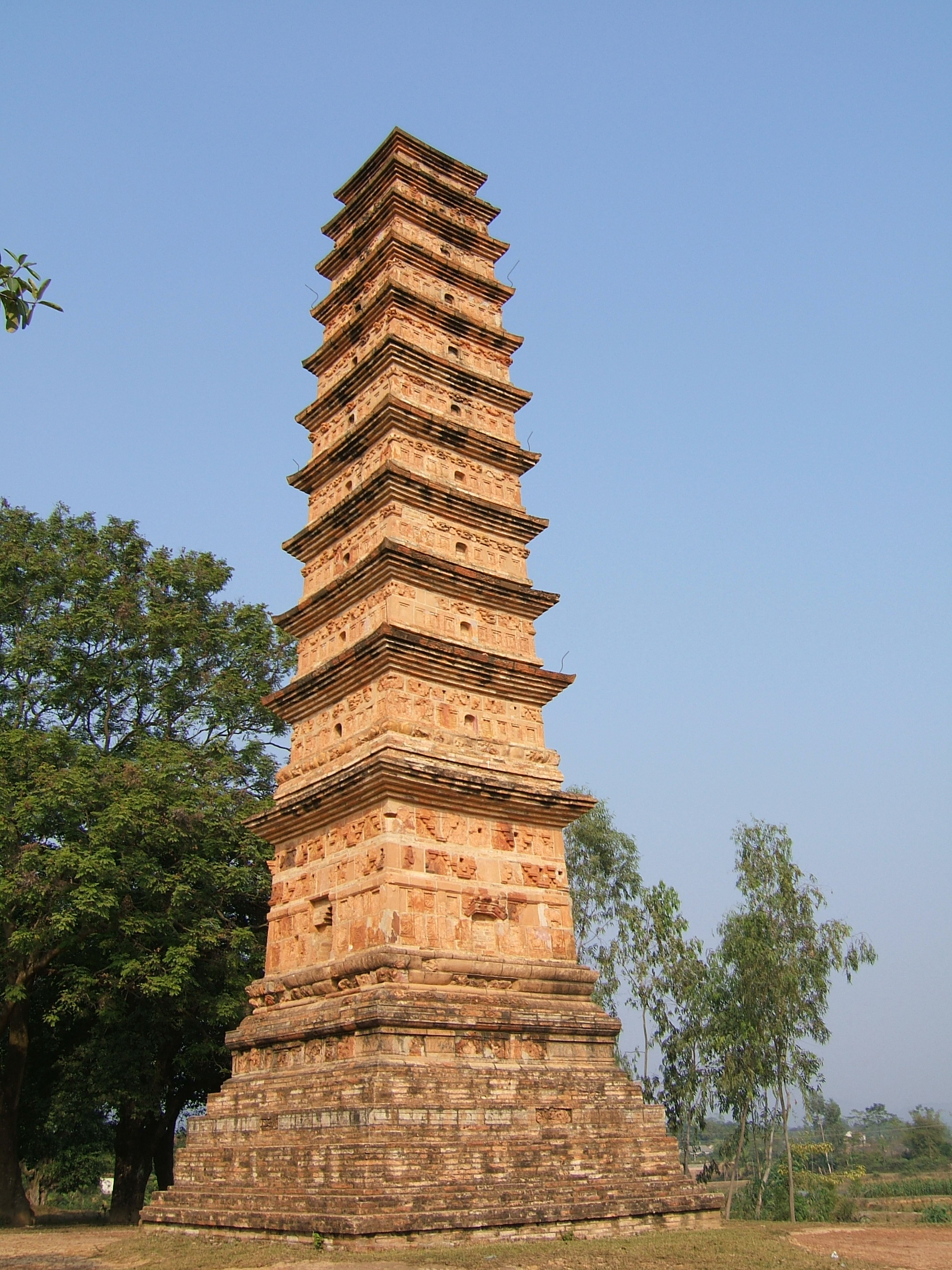
Bình Sơn Pagoda of Vĩnh Khánh Temple, Phú Thọ province, 1200

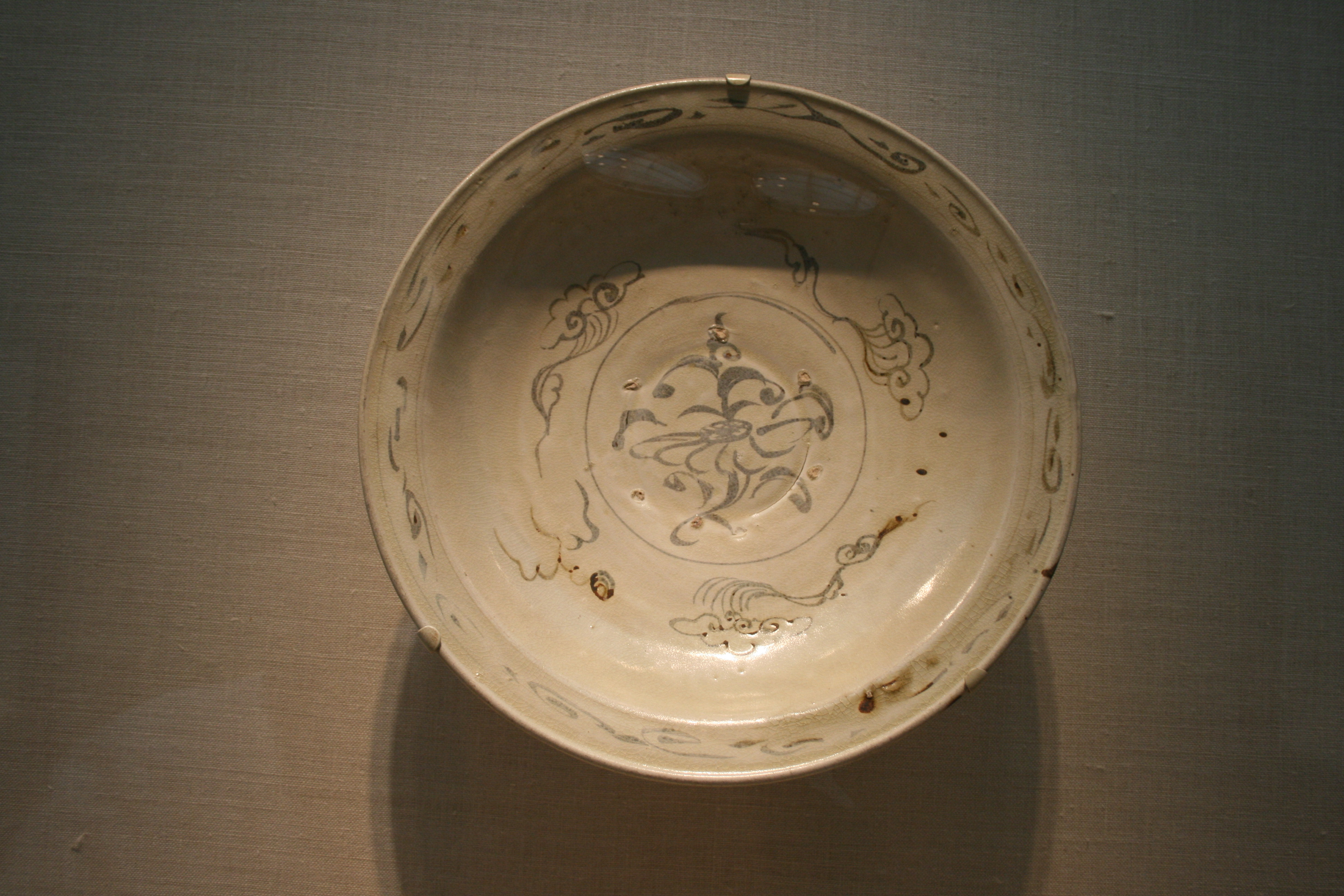
Dish with cursive floral pattern, Trần dynasty period, 14th century. Smithsonian Institution

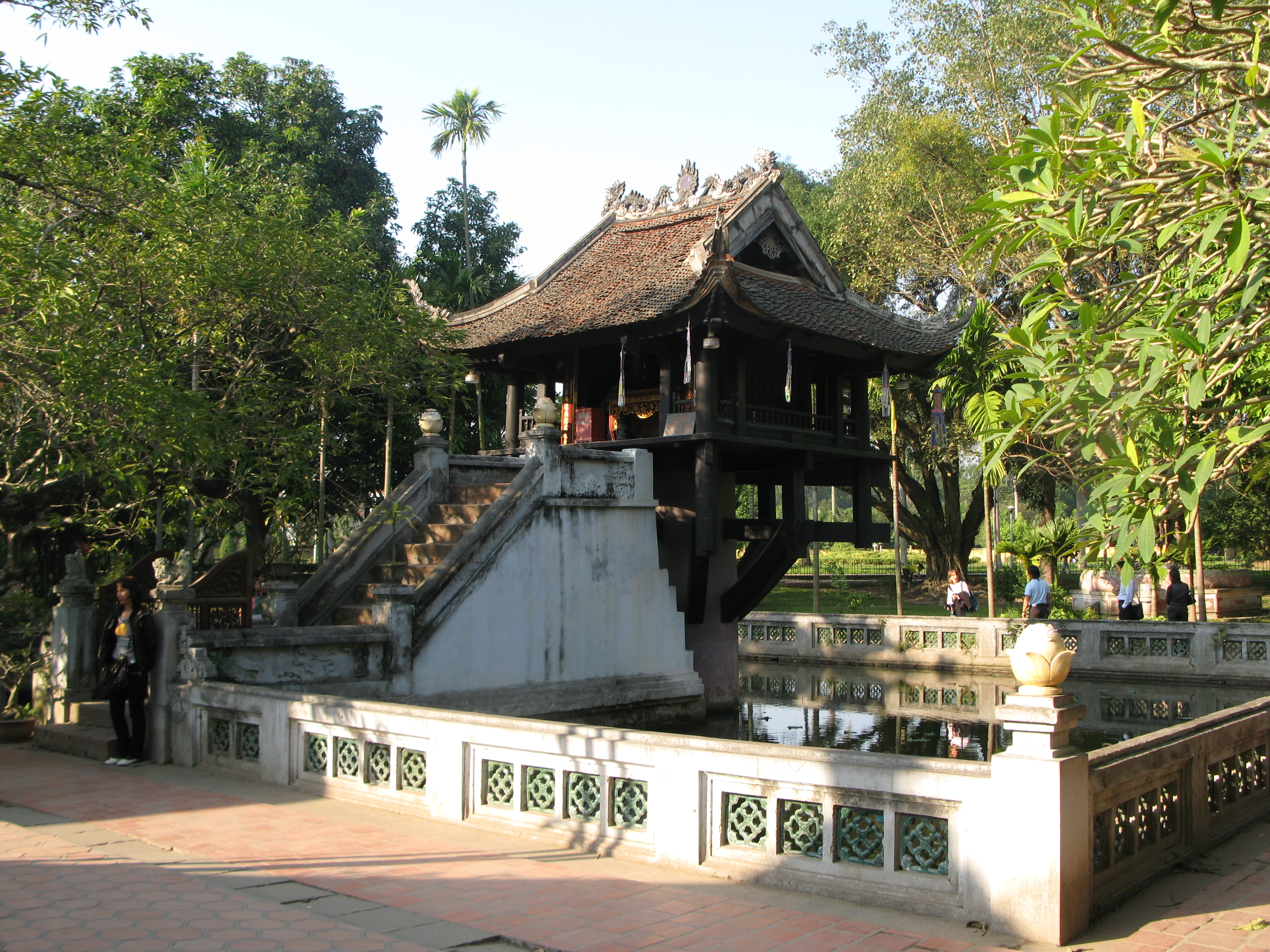
One Pillar Pagoda built by emperor Lý Thái Tông in 1049

When the emperor Lê Long Đĩnh died in 1009, a palace guard commander named Lý Công Uẩn was nominated by the court to take over the throne, and founded the Lý dynasty. This event is regarded as the beginning of another golden era in Vietnamese history, with the following dynasties inheriting the Lý dynasty's prosperity and doing much to maintain and expand it. The way Lý Công Uẩn ascended to the throne was rather uncommon in Vietnamese history. As a high-ranking military commander residing in the capital, he had all opportunities to seize power during the tumultuous years after Emperor Lê Hoàn's death, yet preferring not to do so out of his sense of duty. He was in a way being "elected" by the court after some debate before a consensus was reached.

The Lý monarchs are credited for laying down a concrete foundation for the nation of Vietnam. In 1010, Lý Công Uẩn issued the Edict on the Transfer of the Capital, moving the capital Đại Cồ Việt from Hoa Lư, a natural fortification surrounded by mountains and rivers, to the new capital, Đại La (Hanoi), which was later renamed Thăng Long (Ascending Dragon) by Lý Công Uẩn, after allegedly seeing a dragon flying upwards when he arrived at the capital. Moving the capital, Lý Công Uẩn thus departed from the militarily defensive mentality of his predecessors and envisioned a strong economy as the key to national survival. The third emperor of the dynasty, Lý Thánh Tông renamed the country "Đại Việt" (大越, Great Viet). Successive Lý emperors continued to accomplish far-reaching feats: building a dike system to protect rice farms; founding the Quốc Tử Giám the first noble university; and establishing court examination system to select capable commoners for government positions once every three years; organizing a new system of taxation; establishing humane treatment of prisoners. Women were holding important roles in Lý society as the court ladies were in charge of tax collection. Neighboring Dali kingdom's Vajrayana Buddhism traditions also had influences on Vietnamese beliefs at the time. Lý kings adopted both Buddhism and Taoism as state religions.

The Vietnamese during Lý dynasty had one major war with Song China, and a few invasive campaigns against neighboring Champa in the south. The most notable conflict took place on Chinese territory Guangxi in late 1075. Upon learning that a Song invasion was imminent, the Vietnamese army under the command of Lý Thường Kiệt, and Tông Đản used amphibious operations to preemptively destroy three Song military installations at Yongzhou, Qinzhou, and Lianzhou in Guangdong and Guangxi, and killed 100,000 Chinese. The Song dynasty took revenge and invaded Đại Việt in 1076, but the Song troops were held back at the Battle of Như Nguyệt River commonly known as the Cầu river (Bắc Ninh) about 40 km from the current capital, Hanoi. Neither side was able to force a victory, so the Vietnamese court proposed a truce, which the Song emperor accepted. Champa and the powerful Khmer Empire took advantage of Đại Việt's distraction with the Song to pillage Đại Việt's southern provinces. Together they invaded Đại Việt in 1128 and 1132. Further invasions followed in the subsequent decades.

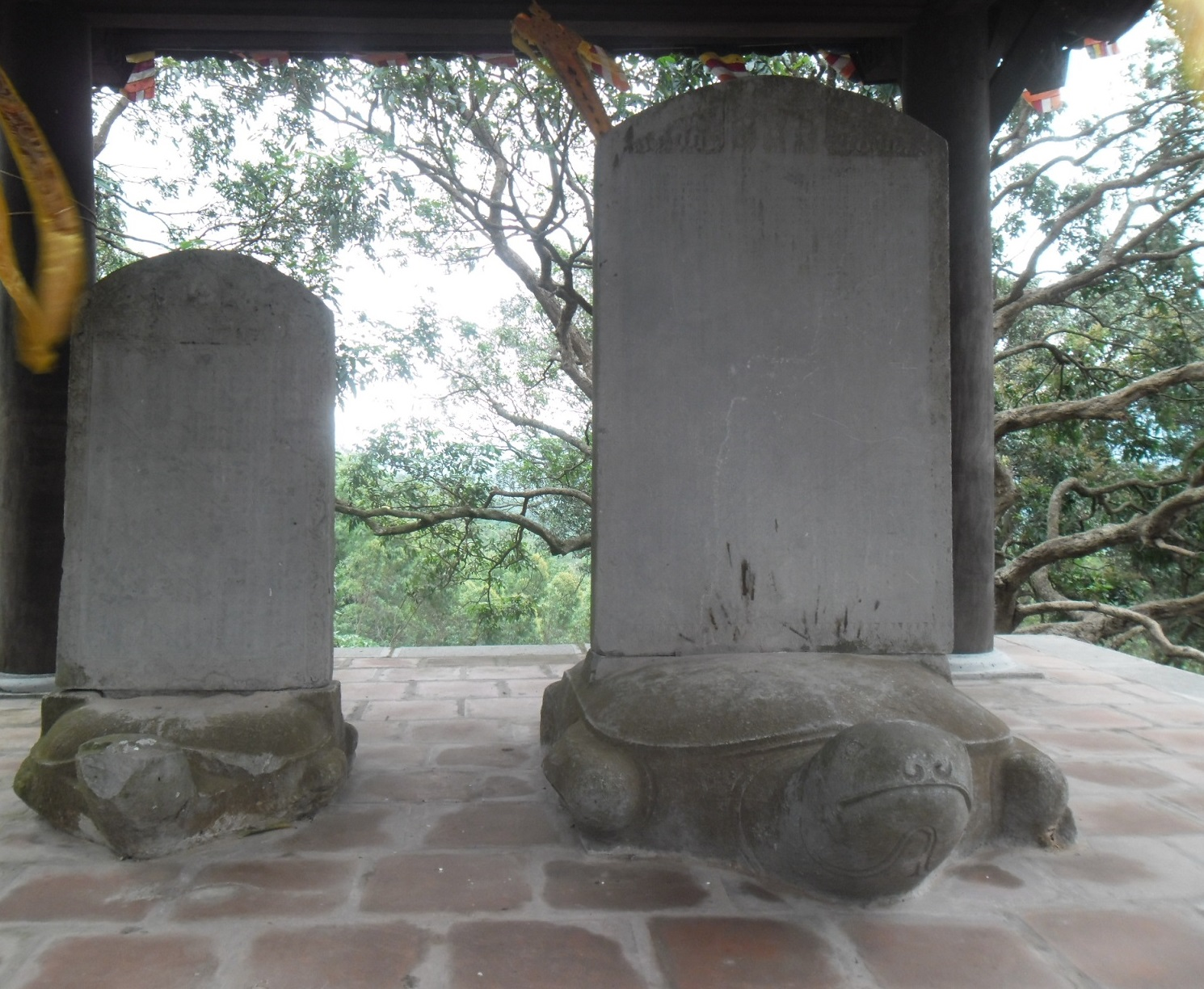
Buddhist inscriptions in Nom (Vietnamese) and Chinese scripts (1366)

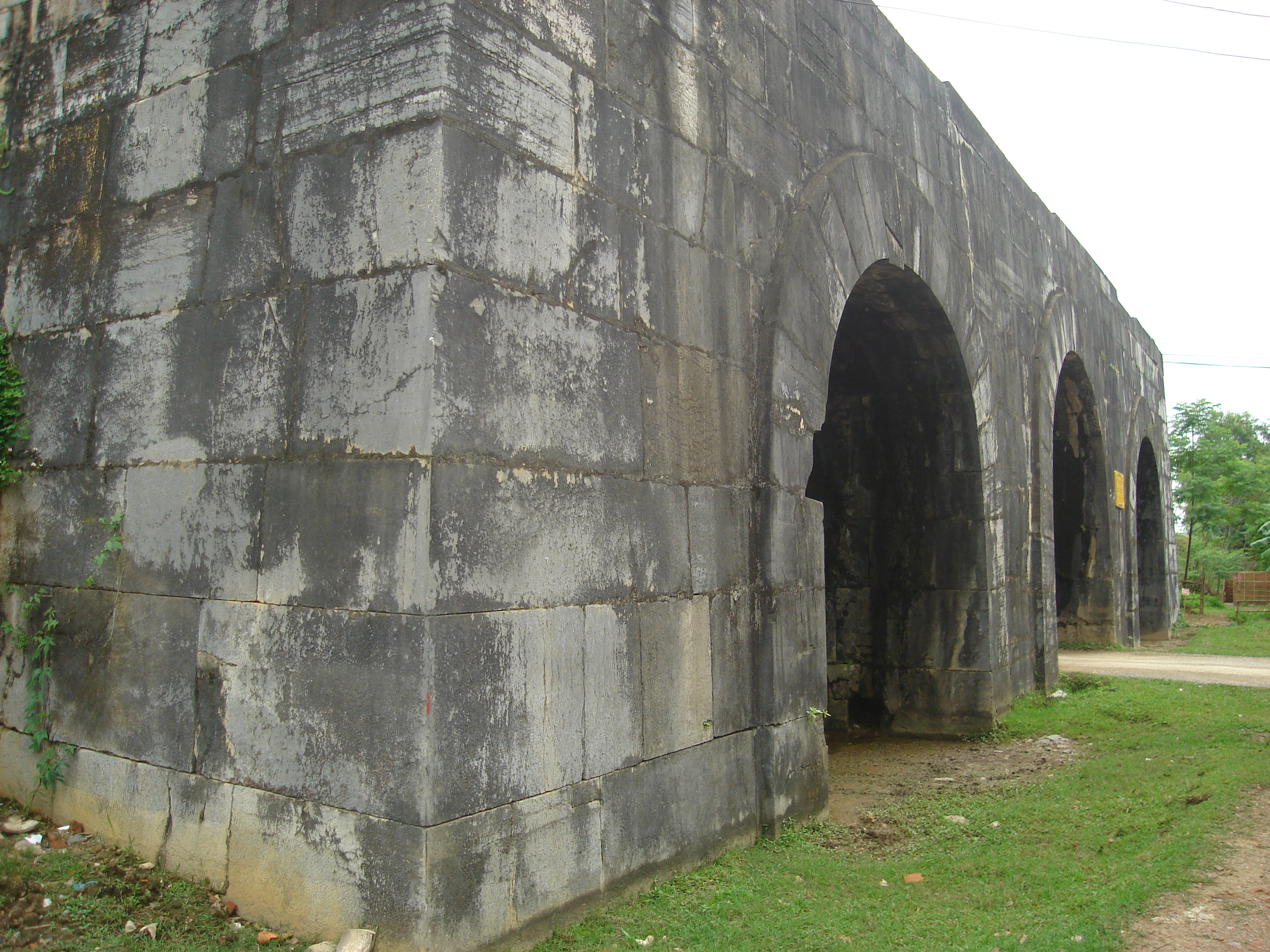
Remain Southern gate of Tây Đô, capital of Dai Viet from 1397 to 1407. UNESCO World Heritage Site.

Vietnamese blue-white porcelain jar, 14th century. Cleveland Museum of Art.

Toward the declining Lý monarch's power in the late 12th century, the Trần clan from Nam Định eventually rise to power. In 1224, powerful court minister Trần Thủ Độ forced the emperor Lý Huệ Tông to become a Buddhist monk and Lý Chiêu Hoàng, Huệ Tông's 8-year-old young daughter, to become ruler of the country. Trần Thủ Độ then arranged the marriage of Chiêu Hoàng to his nephew Trần Cảnh and eventually had the throne transferred to Trần Cảnh, thus begun the Trần dynasty.

Trần Thủ Độ viciously purged members of the Lý nobility; some Lý princes escaped to Korea, including Lý Long Tường. After the purge, the Trần emperors ruled the country in similar manner to the Lý kings. Noted Trần monarch accomplishments include the creation of a system of population records based at the village level, the compilation of a formal 30-volume history of Đại Việt (Đại Việt Sử Ký) by Lê Văn Hưu, and the rising in status of the Nôm script, a system of writing for Vietnamese language. The Trần dynasty also adopted a unique way to train new emperors: when a crown prince reached the age of 18, his predecessor would abdicate and turn the throne over to him, yet holding the title of Retired Emperor (Thái Thượng Hoàng), acting as a mentor to the new Emperor.

During the Trần dynasty, the armies of the Mongol Empire and the Mongol Yuan dynasty of China under Möngke Khan and Kublai Khan invaded Đại Việt in 1258, 1285, and 1287–88. Đại Việt repelled all attacks of the Yuan Mongols during the reign of Kublai Khan. Three Mongol armies said to have numbered from 300,000 to 500,000 men were defeated. The key to Annam's successes was to avoid the Mongols' strength in open field battles and city sieges—the Trần court abandoned the capital and the cities. The Mongols were then countered decisively at their weak points, which were battles in swampy areas such as Chương Dương, Hàm Tử, Vạn Kiếp and on rivers such as Vân Đồn and Bạch Đằng. The Mongols also suffered from tropical diseases and loss of supplies to Trần army's raids. The Yuan-Trần war reached its climax when the retreating Yuan fleet was decimated at the Battle of Bạch Đằng (1288). The military architect behind Annam's victories was Commander Trần Quốc Tuấn, more popularly known as Trần Hưng Đạo. To avoid further disastrous campaigns, the Tran and Champa acknowledged Mongol supremacy.

In 1288, Venetian explorer Marco Polo visited Champa and Đại Việt. It was also during this period that the Vietnamese waged war against the southern kingdom of Champa, continuing the Vietnamese long history of southern expansion (known as Nam tiến) that had begun shortly after gaining independence in the 10th century. Often, they encountered strong resistance from the Chams. After the successful alliance with Champa during the Mongol invasion, king Trần Nhân Tông of Đại Việt gained two Champa provinces, located around present-day Huế, through the peaceful means of the political marriage of Princess Huyền Trân to Cham king Jaya Simhavarman III. Not long after the nuptials, the king died, and the princess returned to her northern home to avoid a Cham custom that would have required her to join her husband in death. Champa was made a tributary state of Vietnam in 1312, but ten years later they regained independence and eventually waged a 30-years long war against the Vietnamese, to regain these lands and encouraged by the decline of Đại Việt in the course of the 14th century. Cham troops led by king Chế Bồng Nga (Cham: Po Binasuor or Che Bonguar, r. 1360–1390) killed king Trần Duệ Tông through a battle in Vijaya (1377). Multiple Cham northward invasions from 1371 to 1390 put Vietnamese capital Thăng Long and Vietnamese economy in destruction. However, in 1390 the Cham naval offensive against Hanoi was halted by the Vietnamese general Trần Khát Chân, whose soldiers made use of cannons.

The wars with Champa and the Mongols left Đại Việt exhausted and bankrupt. The Trần family was in turn overthrown by one of its own court officials, Hồ Quý Ly. Hồ Quý Ly forced the last Trần emperor to abdicate and assumed the throne in 1400. He changed the country name to Đại Ngu and moved the capital to Tây Đô, Western Capital (Thanh Hóa). Thăng Long was renamed Đông Đô, Eastern Capital. Although widely blamed for causing national disunity and losing the country later to the Ming Empire, Hồ Quý Ly's reign actually introduced a lot of progressive, ambitious reforms, including the addition of mathematics to the national examinations, the open critique of Confucian philosophy, the use of paper currency in place of coins, investment in building large warships and cannons, and land reform. He ceded the throne to his son, Hồ Hán Thương, in 1401 and assumed the title Thái Thượng Hoàng, in similar manner to the Trần kings.

=== Champa from 1220 to 1471 ===
Champa from 13th century to 1471

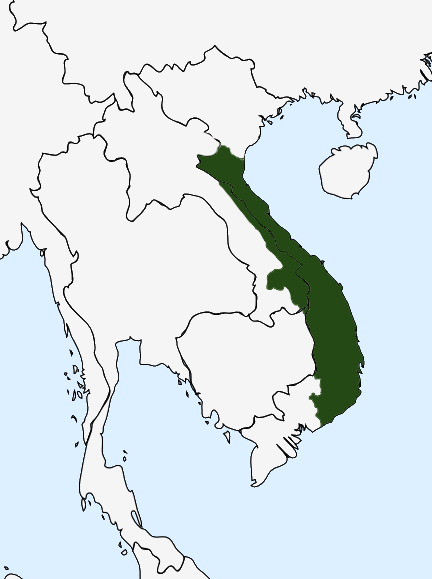
Champa at its zenith during the reign of Po Binasuor (r. 1360–90)

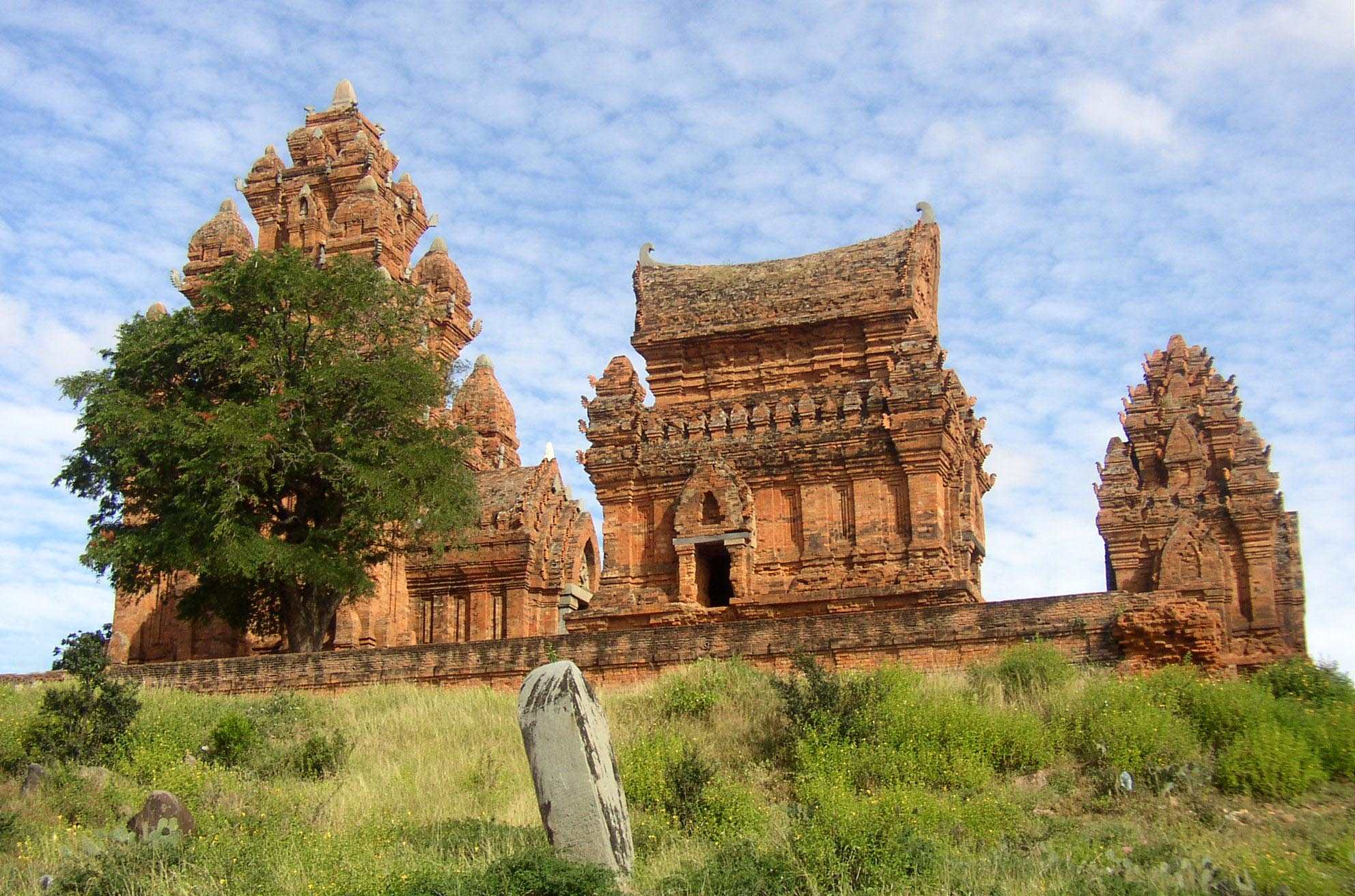
Po Klong Garai temple, built by king Jaya Simhavarman III (r. 1288–1307)

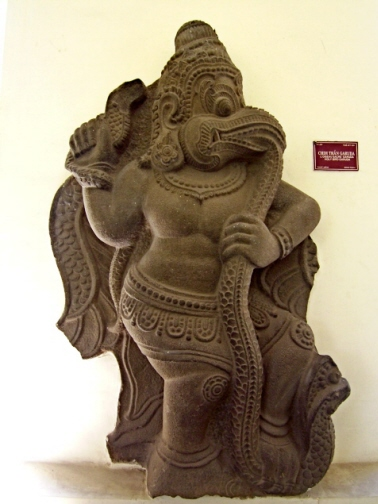
Sculpture of Garuda, Vijaya, 13th century

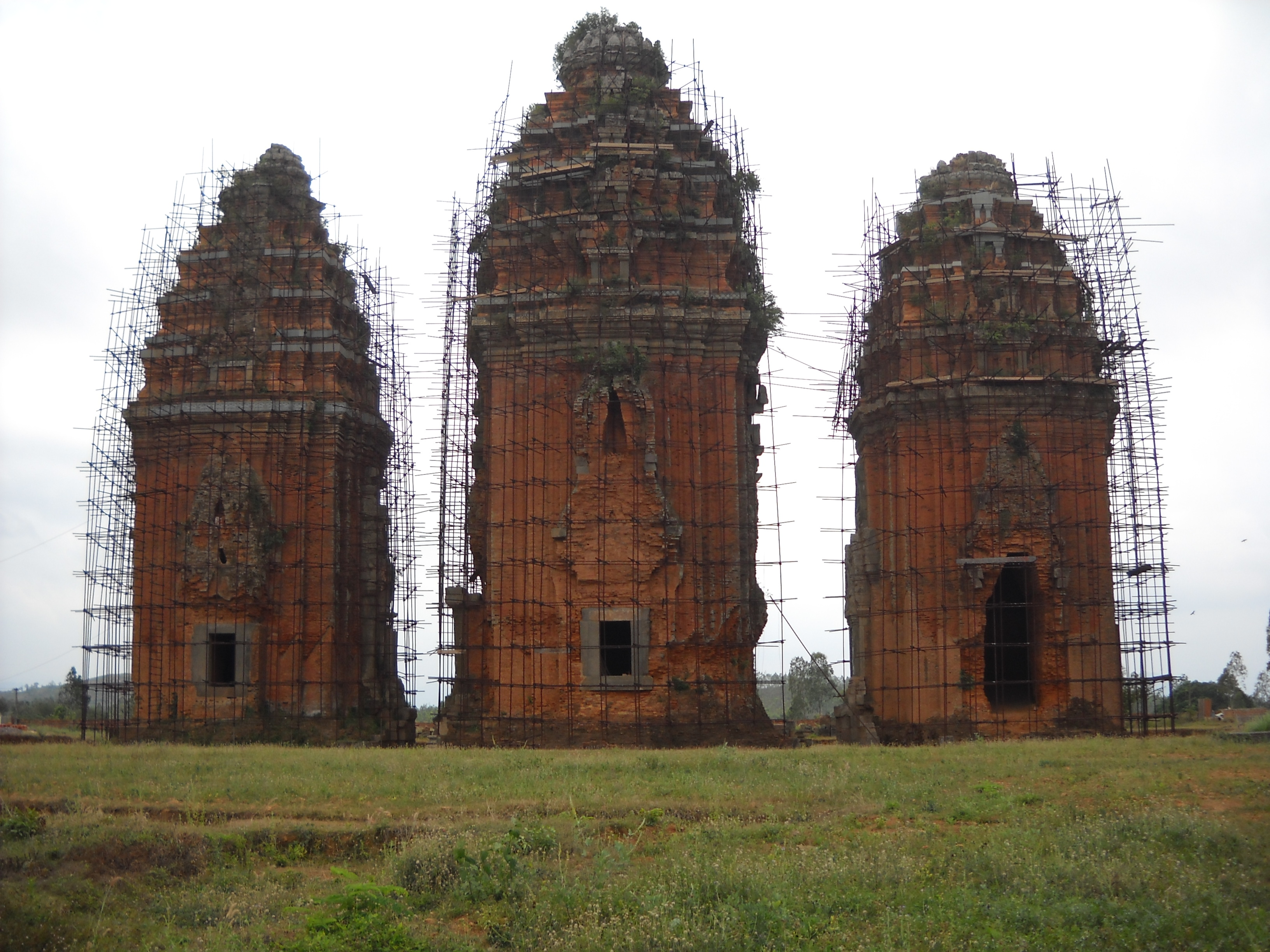
Cham temple in Duong Long (12th century)

After having been restored from Khmer domination in 1220, Champa continued to face another counter-power from the north. After their invasion of 982, the Vietnamese had been pushing war against Champa in 1020, 1044, and 1069, plundered Cham capital. In 1252 king Tran Thai Tong of the new dynasty of Dai Viet led an incursion into Cham territories, captured many Cham concubines and women. This might be the reason for the death of Jaya Paramesvaravarman II as he died in the same year. His younger brother, Prince Harideva of Sakanvijaya, was crowned as Jaya Indravarman VI (r. 1252–1257). The new king was however assassinated by his nephew in 1257, who became Indravarman V (r. 1257–1288).

The new Mongol Yuan threat soon dragged two hostile kingdoms Champa and Dai Viet close together. The Yuan emperor Kublai demanded Cham submission in 1278 and 1280, both refused. In early 1283 Kublai sent a sea expedition led by Sogetu to invade Champa. The Cham retreated to the mountains, successfully waged a guerrilla resistance that bogged down the Mongols. Sogetu was driven to the north, and later killed by joint Cham–Vietnamese forces in June 1285. Although having repulsed the Mongol yokes, the Cham king sent an ambassador to the great Khan in October 1285. His successor, Jaya Simhavarman III (r. 1288–1307), married with a Vietnamese Queen (daughter of the ruling Vietnamese king) in 1306, and Dai Viet acquired two northern provinces.

In 1307 the new Cham king Simhavarman IV (r. 1307–1312), set out to retake the two provinces to protest against the Vietnamese agreement but was defeated and taken as a prisoner. Champa thus became a Vietnamese vassal state. The Cham revolted in 1318. In 1326 they managed to defeat the Vietnamese and reasserted independence. Royal upheaval within the Cham court resumed until 1360, when a strong Cham king was enthroned, known as Po Binasuor (r. 1360–90). During his thirty-year reign, Champa gained its momentum peak. Po Binasuor annihilated the Vietnamese invaders in 1377, ransacked Hanoi in 1371, 1378, 1379, and 1383, nearly had united all Vietnam for the first time by the 1380s. During a naval battle in early 1390, the Cham conqueror however was killed by Vietnamese firearm units, thus ending the short-lived rising period of the Cham kingdom. During the next decades, Champa returned to its status quo of peace. After much warfare and dismal conflicts, king Indravarman VI (r. 1400–41) reestablished relations with the second kingdom of Dai Viet's ruler Le Loi in 1428.

The Islamization of Champa began in the 8th century to 11th century, being faster proselytized during the 14th and 15th centuries. Ibn Battuta during his visit to Champa in 1340, described a princess who met him, spoke in Turkish, was literate in Arabic, and wrote out the bismillah in the presence of the visitor. Islam further got more popular in Cham society after the fall of Champa in 1471. After the death of Indravarman VI, succession disputes escalated into civil war between Cham princes, weakening the kingdom. The Vietnamese took advantage, raided Vijaya in 1446. In 1471 Dai Viet king Le Thanh Tong conquered Champa, killed 60,000 people, and took away 30,000 prisoners included the Cham king and the royal family. Champa was reduced to the rump state of Panduranga, which persisted to exist until being fully absorbed in 1832 by the Vietnamese Empire.

=== Fourth Chinese Domination (1407–1427) ===
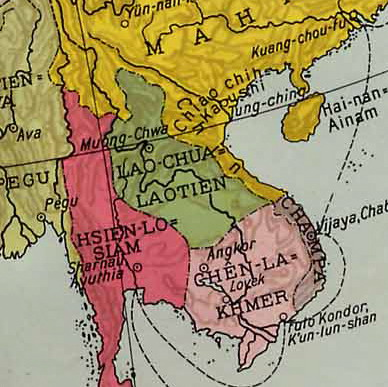
Ming Chinese occupation of Vietnam (1407–1427)

In 1407, under the pretext of helping to restore the Trần monarchs, Chinese Ming troops invaded Đại Ngu and captured Hồ Quý Ly and Hồ Hán Thương. The Hồ family came to an end after only 7 years in power. The Ming occupying force annexed Đại Ngu into the Ming Empire after claiming that there was no heir to the Trần throne. Vietnam, weakened by dynastic feuds and the wars with Champa, quickly succumbed. The Ming conquest was harsh. Vietnam was annexed directly as a province of China, the old policy of cultural assimilation again imposed forcibly, and the country was ruthlessly exploited. However, by this time, Vietnamese nationalism had reached a point where attempts to sinicize them could only strengthen further resistance. Almost immediately, Trần loyalists started a resistance war. The resistance, under the leadership of Trần Quý Khoáng at first gained some advances, yet as Trần Quý Khoáng executed two top commanders out of suspicion, a rift widened within his ranks and resulted in his defeat in 1413.

=== Restored Dai Viet period (1428–1527) ===
==== Later Lê dynasty – unified period (1428–1527) ====
Đại Việt between 1428 to 1527

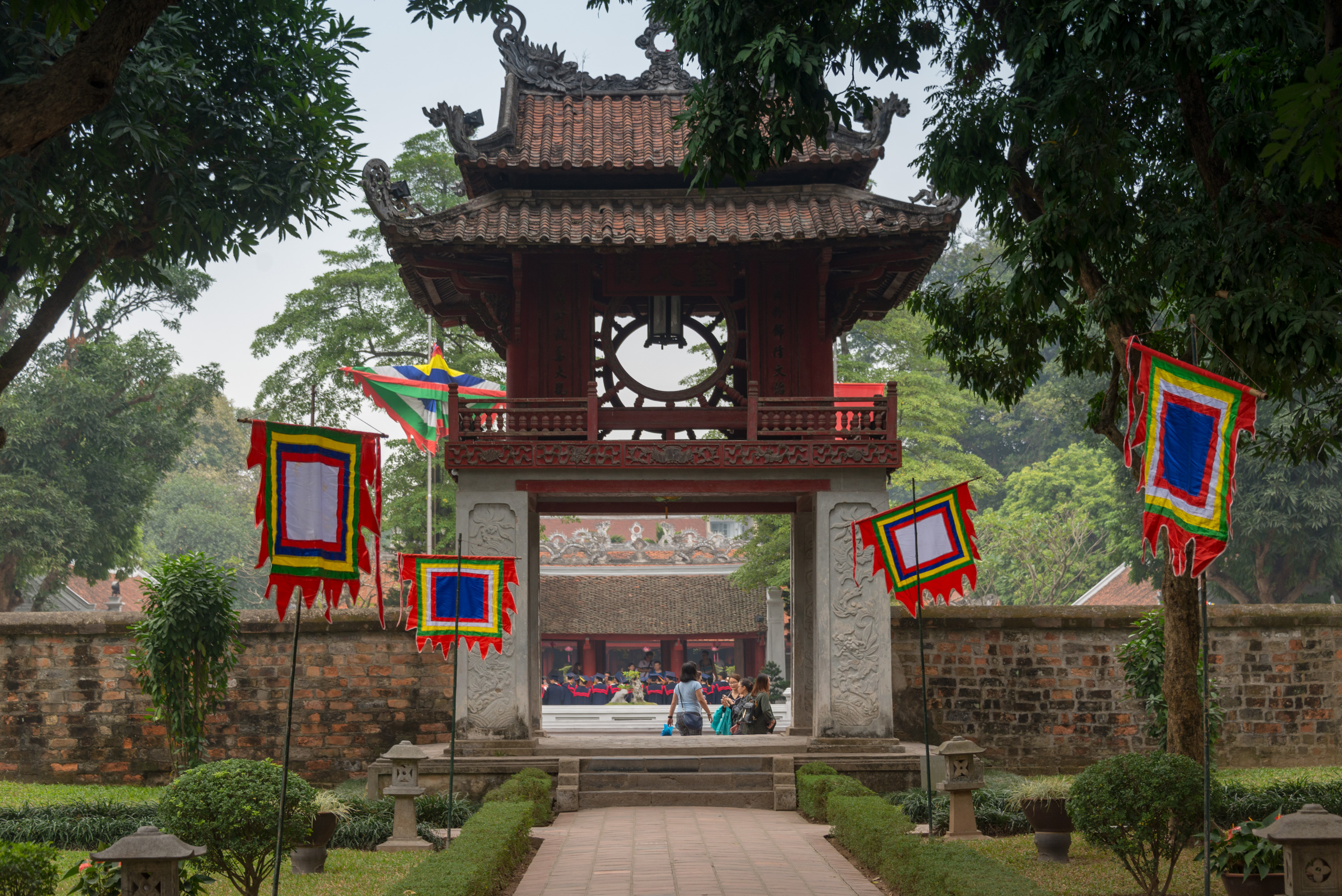
Entrance to the Confucian Temple (Van Mieu), Hanoi

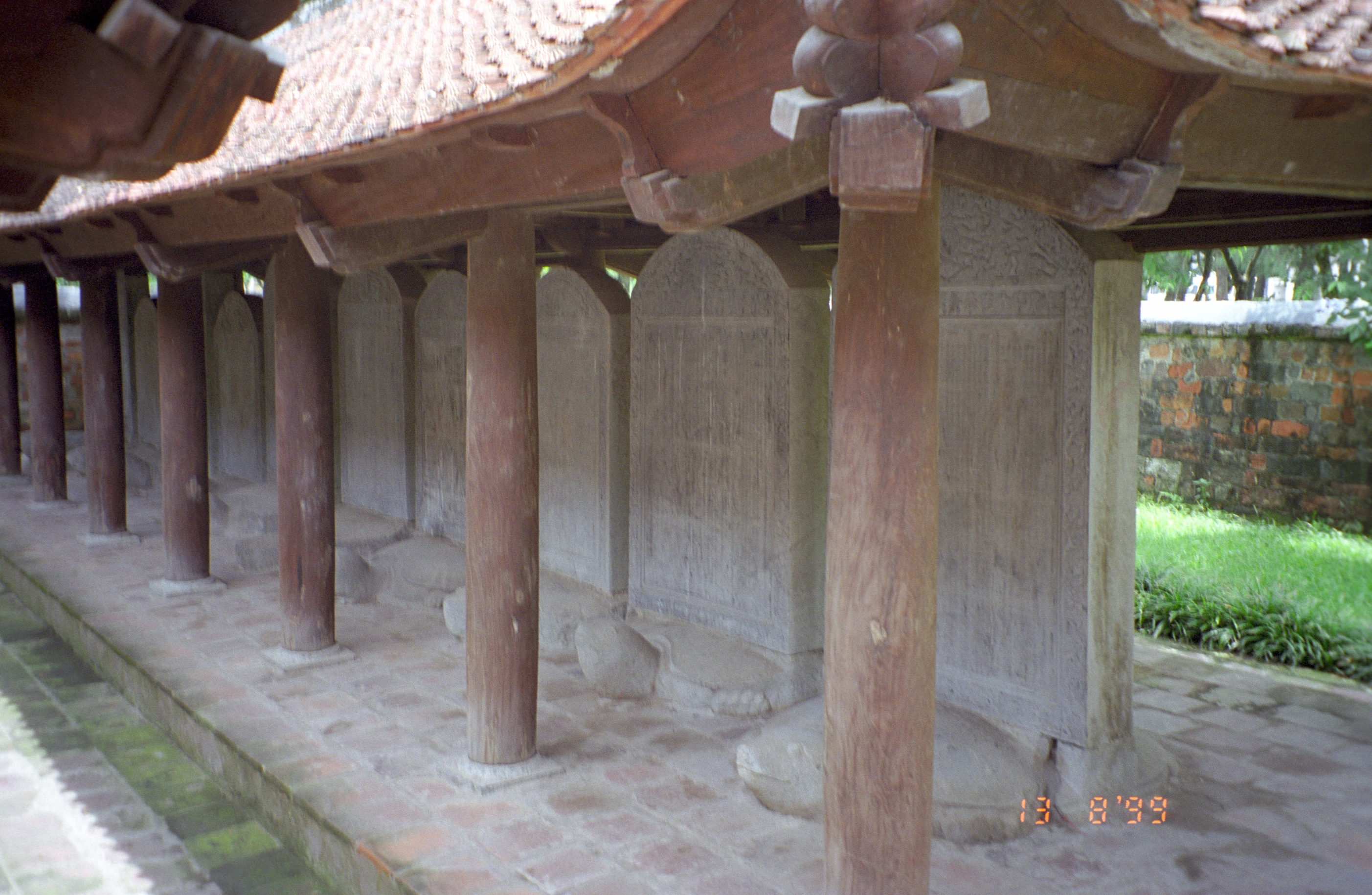
Stelae at Van Mieu record names of graduates of the Vietnamese Imperial court examinations, 1442–1779

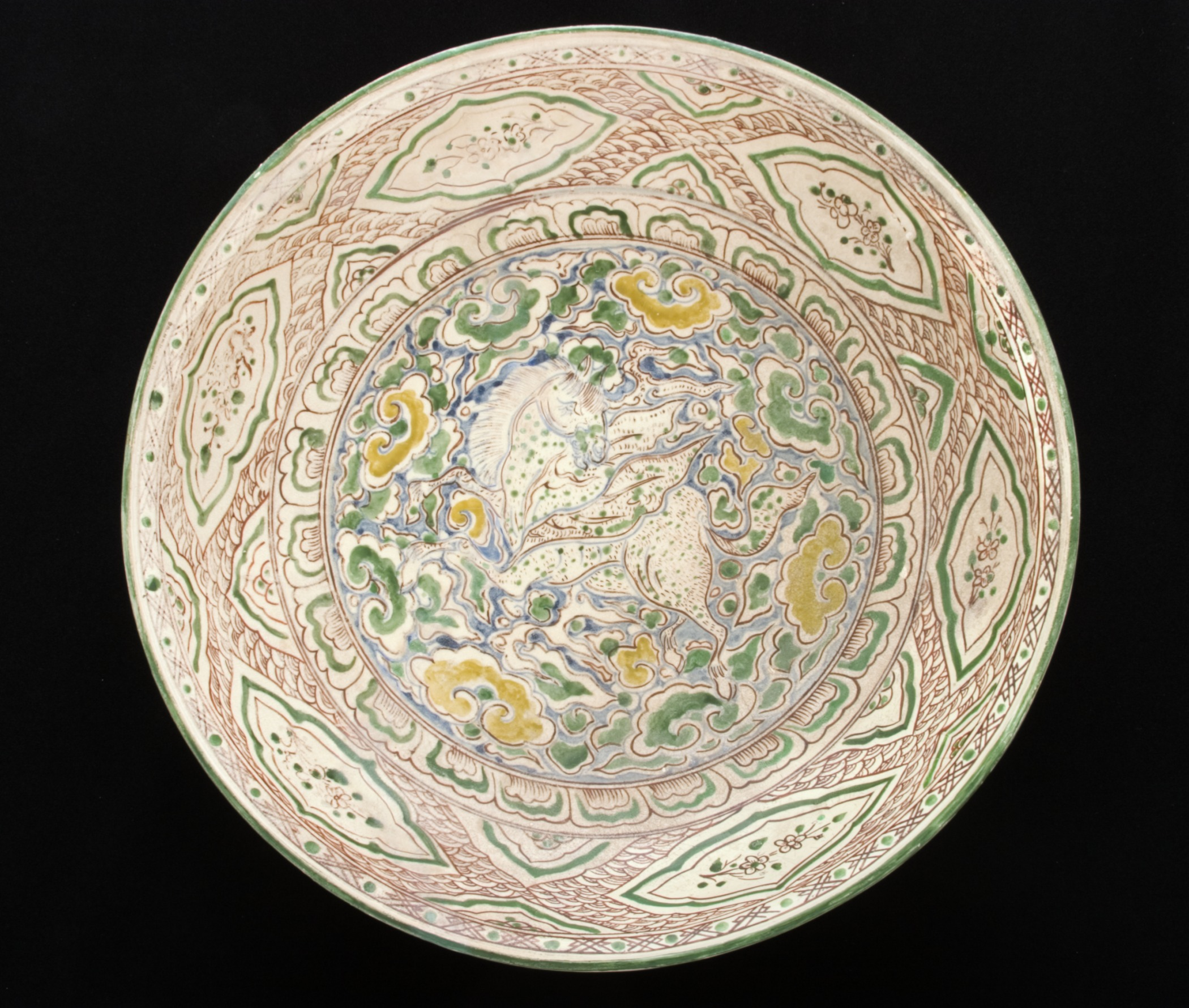
Galloping winged horse, early 16th century Vietnamese porcelain dish. Los Angeles County Museum of Art.

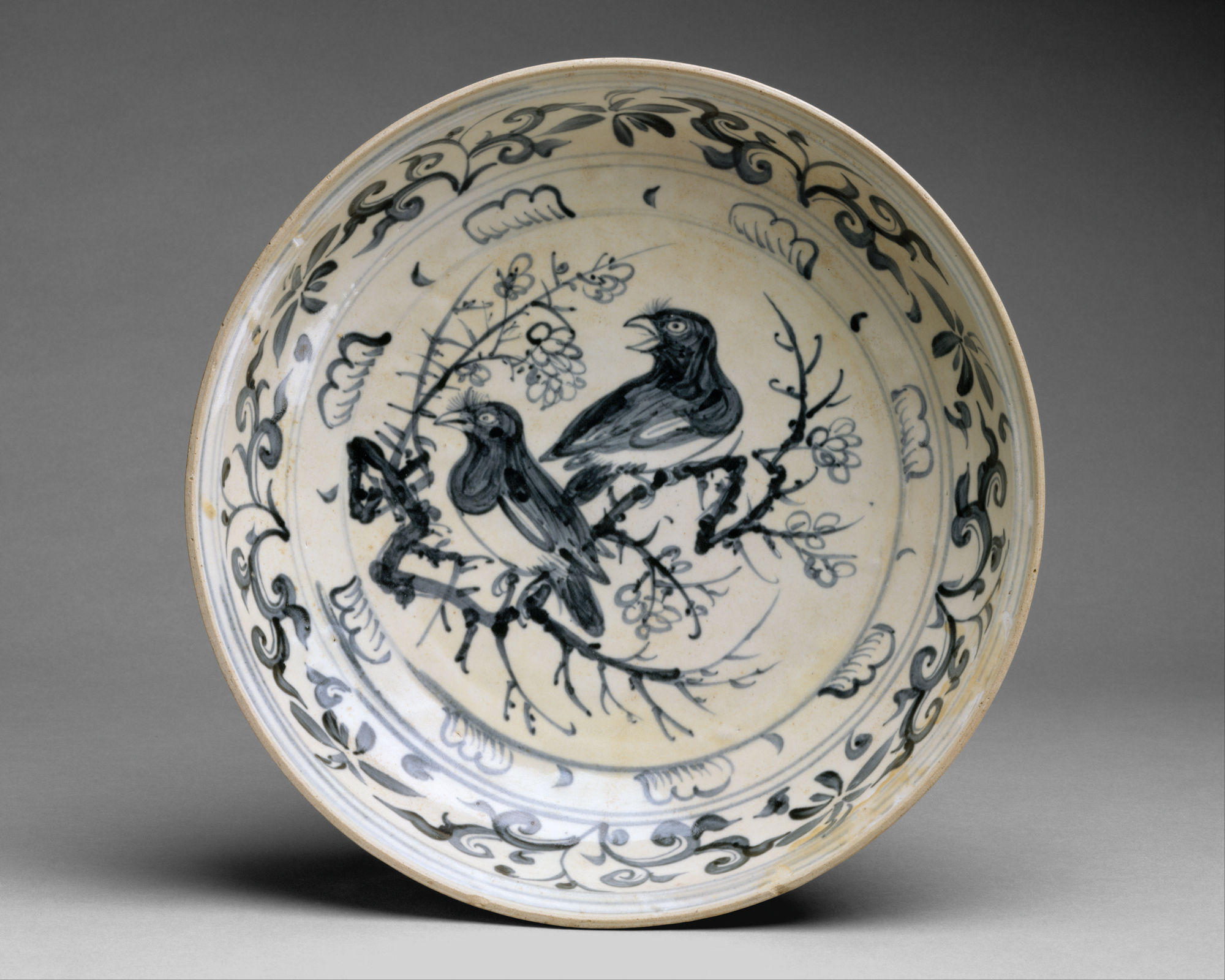
Magpies on an early spring plum branch, cobalt underglaze dish, 15th-16th century. Metropolitan Museum of Art. Vietnamese ceramics reached a productional and artistic peak during the Later Lê period.

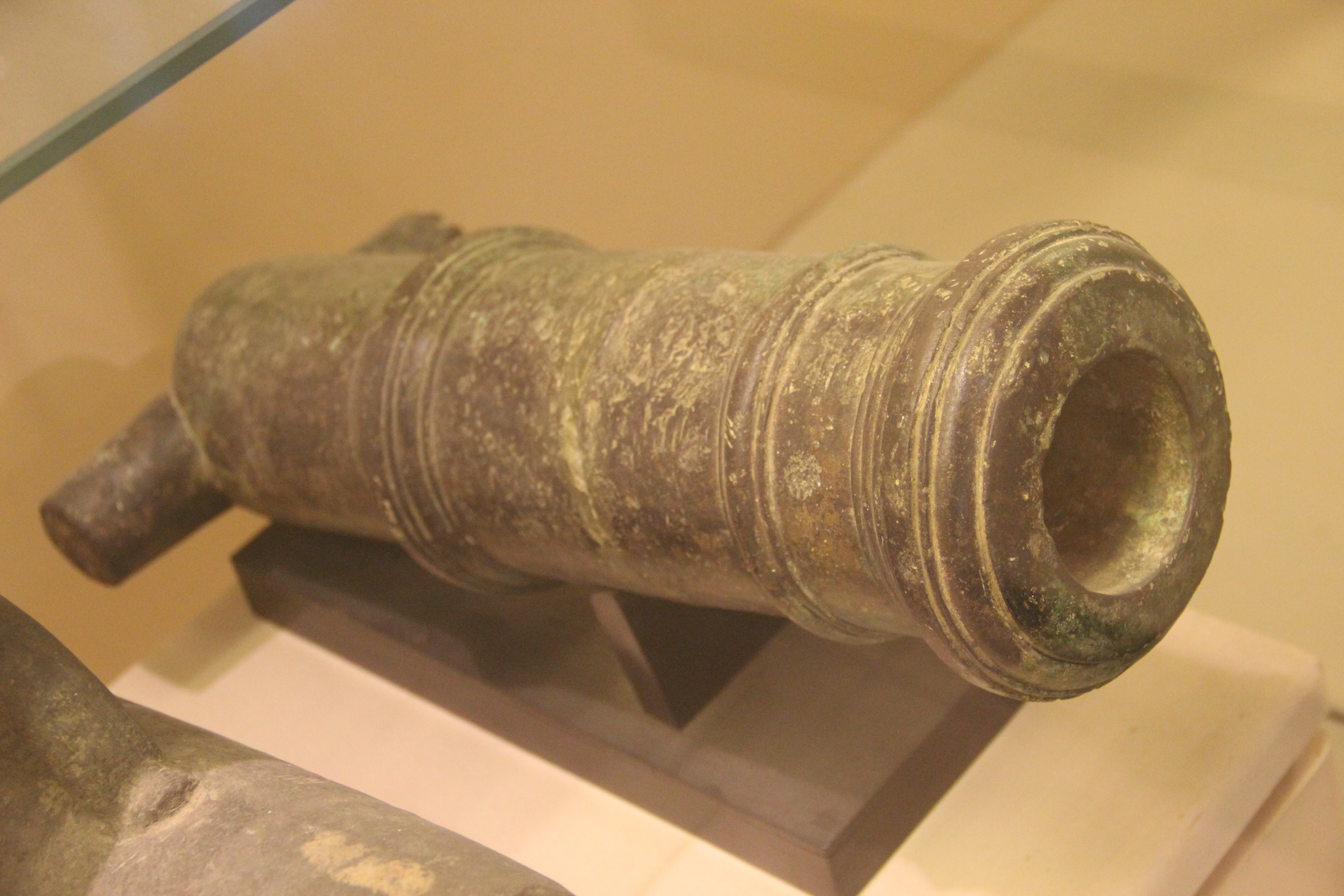
Cannons of Vietnam during the Later Lê dynasty

In 1418, Lê Lợi–a wealthy aristocrat in Thanh Hóa–led the Lam Sơn uprising against the Ming from his base of Lam Sơn. Overcoming many early setbacks and with strategic advice from Nguyễn Trãi, Lê Lợi's movement finally gathered momentum. In September 1426, the Lam Sơn rebellion marched northward, ultimately defeated the Ming army in the Battle of Tốt Động – Chúc Động in south of Hanoi by using cannons. Then Lê Lợi's forces launched a siege at Đông Quan (Hanoi), the capital of the Ming occupation. The Xuande Emperor of Ming China responded by sent two reinforcement forces of 122,000 men, but Lê Lợi staged an ambush and killed the Ming commander Liu Shan in Chi Lăng. Ming troops at Đông Quan surrendered. The Lam Sơn rebels defeated 200,000 Ming soldiers.

In April 1428, Lê Lợi reestablished the independent of Vietnam under his Lê dynasty. Lê Lợi renamed the country back to Đại Việt and moved the capital back to Thăng Long, renamed it Đông Kinh.

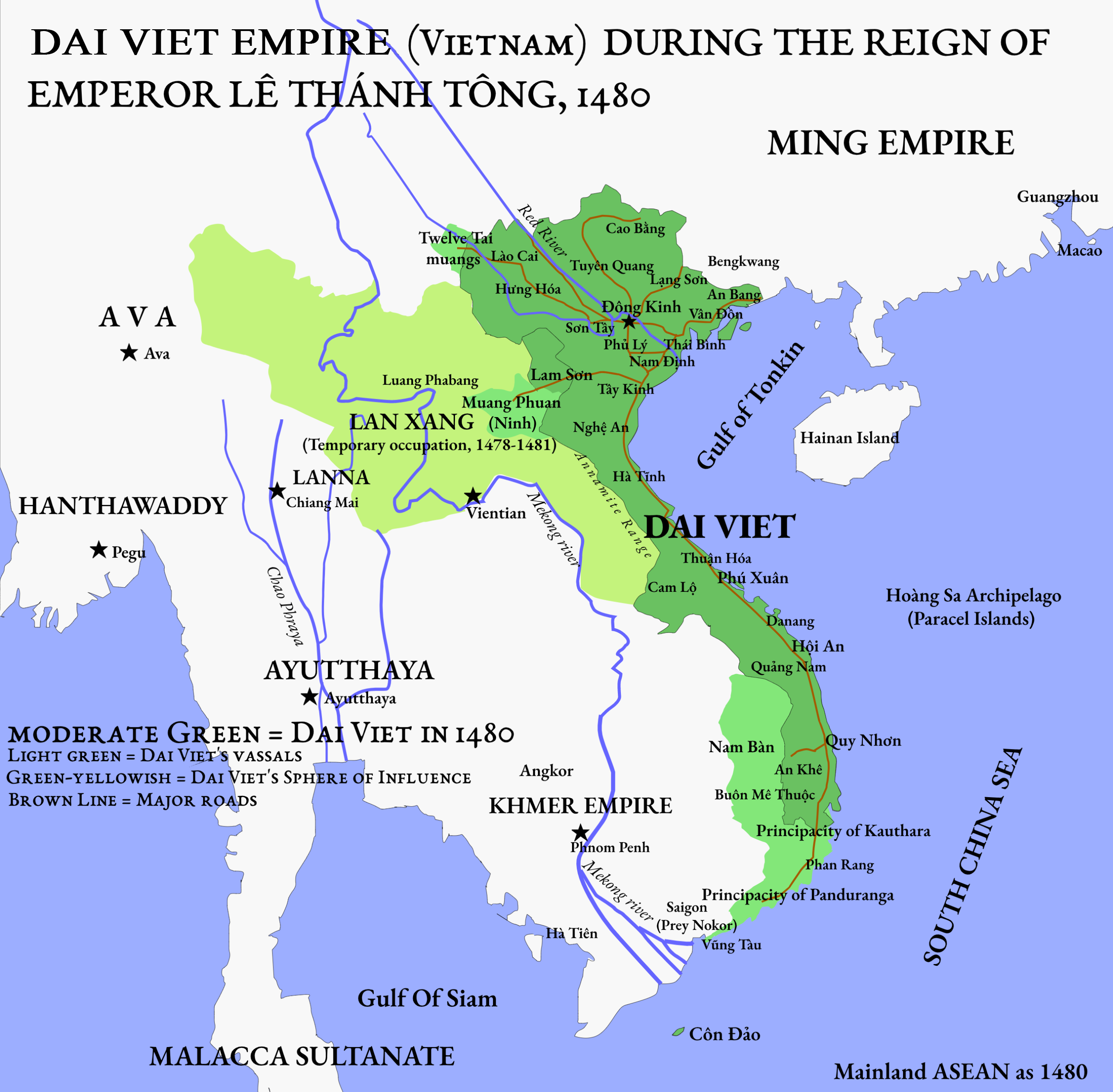
The territory of Đại Việt during the reign of Lê Thánh Tông (1460–1497), including conquests in Muang Phuan and Champa.

The Lê kings carried out land reforms to revitalize the economy after the war. Unlike the Lý and Trần kings, who were more influenced by Buddhism, the Lê kings leaned toward Confucianism. A comprehensive set of laws, the Hồng Đức code was introduced in 1483 with some strong Confucian elements, yet also included some progressive rules, such as the rights of women. Art and architecture during the Lê dynasty also became more influenced by Chinese styles than during previous Lý and Trần dynasties. The Lê dynasty commissioned the drawing of national maps and had Ngô Sĩ Liên continue the task of writing Đại Việt's history up to the time of Lê Lợi.

Overpopulation and land shortages stimulated a Vietnamese expansion south. In 1471, Đại Việt troops led by king Lê Thánh Tông invaded Champa and captured its capital Vijaya. This event effectively ended Champa as a powerful kingdom, although some smaller surviving Cham states lasted for a few centuries more. It initiated the dispersal of the Cham people across Southeast Asia. With the kingdom of Champa mostly destroyed and the Cham people exiled or suppressed, Vietnamese colonization of what is now central Vietnam proceeded without substantial resistance. However, despite becoming greatly outnumbered by Vietnamese settlers and the integration of formerly Cham territory into the Vietnamese nation, the majority of Cham people nevertheless remained in Vietnam and they are now considered one of the key minorities in modern Vietnam. Vietnamese armies also raided the Mekong Delta, which the declining Khmer Empire could no longer defend. The city of Huế, founded in 1600 lies close to where the Champa capital of Indrapura once stood. In 1479, Lê Thánh Tông also campaigned against Laos in the Vietnamese–Lao War and captured its capital Luang Prabang, in which later the city was totally ransacked and destroyed by the Vietnamese. He made further incursions westwards into the Irrawaddy River region in modern-day Burma before withdrawing. After the death of Lê Thánh Tông, Đại Việt fell into a swift decline (1497–1527), with 6 rulers in within 30 years of failing economy, natural disasters and rebellions raged through the country. European traders and missionaries, reaching Vietnam in the midst of the Age of Discovery, were at first Portuguese, and started spreading Christianity since 1533.

=== Disunified period (1527–1802) ===
==== Mạc and Later Lê dynasties (1527–1592) ====
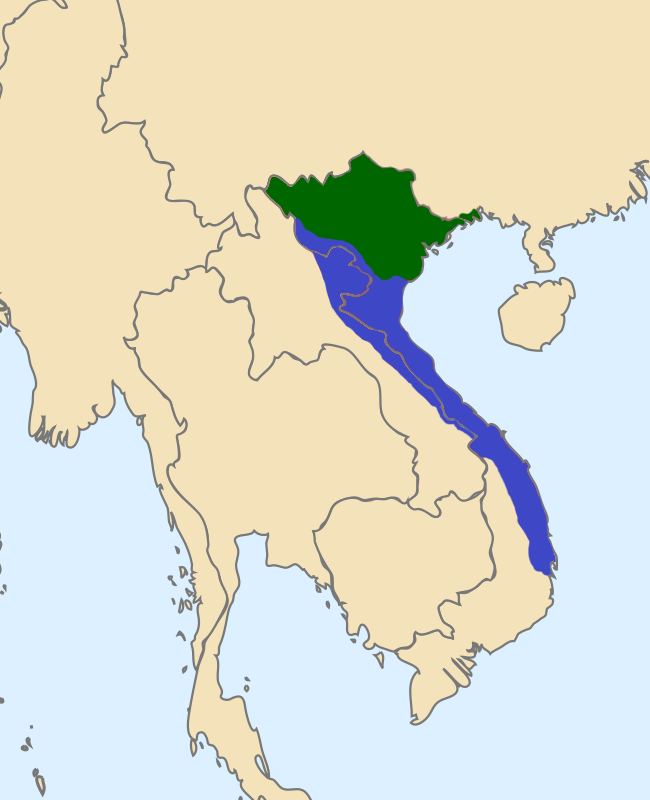
From 1533 until 1592, Vietnam was divided between the northern Mac dynasty and the southern Le dynasty.

The Lê dynasty was overthrown by its general named Mạc Đăng Dung in 1527. He killed the Lê emperor and proclaimed himself emperor, starting the Mạc dynasty. After defeating many revolutions for two years, Mạc Đăng Dung adopted the Trần dynasty's practice and ceded the throne to his son, Mạc Đăng Doanh, and he became Thái Thượng Hoàng.

Meanwhile, Nguyễn Kim, a former official in the Lê court, revolted against the Mạc and helped king Lê Trang Tông restore the Lê court in the Thanh Hóa area. Thus a civil war began between the Northern Court (Mạc) and the Southern Court (Restored Lê). Nguyễn Kim's side controlled the southern part of Annam (from Thanhhoa to the south), leaving the north (including Đông Kinh-Hanoi) under Mạc control. When Nguyễn Kim was assassinated in 1545, military power fell into the hands of his son-in-law, Trịnh Kiểm. In 1558, Nguyễn Kim's son, Nguyễn Hoàng, suspecting that Trịnh Kiểm might kill him as he had done to his brother to secure power, asked to be governor of the far south provinces around present-day Quảng Bình to Bình Định. Hoàng pretended to be insane, so Kiểm was fooled into thinking that sending Hoàng south was a good move as Hoàng would be quickly killed in the lawless border regions. However, Hoàng governed the south effectively while Trịnh Kiểm, and then his son Trịnh Tùng, carried on the war against the Mạc. Nguyễn Hoàng sent money and soldiers north to help the war but gradually he became more and more independent, transforming their realm's economic fortunes by turning it into an international trading post.

The civil war between the Lê-Trịnh and Mạc dynasties ended in 1592, when the army of Trịnh Tùng conquered Hanoi and executed king Mạc Mậu Hợp. Survivors of the Mạc royal family fled to the northern mountains in the province of Cao Bằng and continued to rule there until 1677 when Trịnh Tạc conquered this last Mạc territory. The Lê monarchs, ever since Nguyễn Kim's restoration, only acted as figureheads. After the fall of the Mạc dynasty, all real power in the north belonged to the Trịnh lords. Meanwhile, the Ming court reluctantly decided on a military intervention into the Vietnamese civil war, but Mạc Đăng Dung offered ritual submission to the Ming Empire, which was accepted. Since the late 16th century, trades and contacts between Japan and Vietnam increased as they established relationship in 1591. The Tokugawa Shogunate of Japan and governor Nguyễn Hoàng of Quảng Nam exchanged total 34 letters from 1589 to 1612, and a Japanese town was established in the city of Hội An in 1604.

==== Trịnh and Nguyễn lords (1600–1777) ====
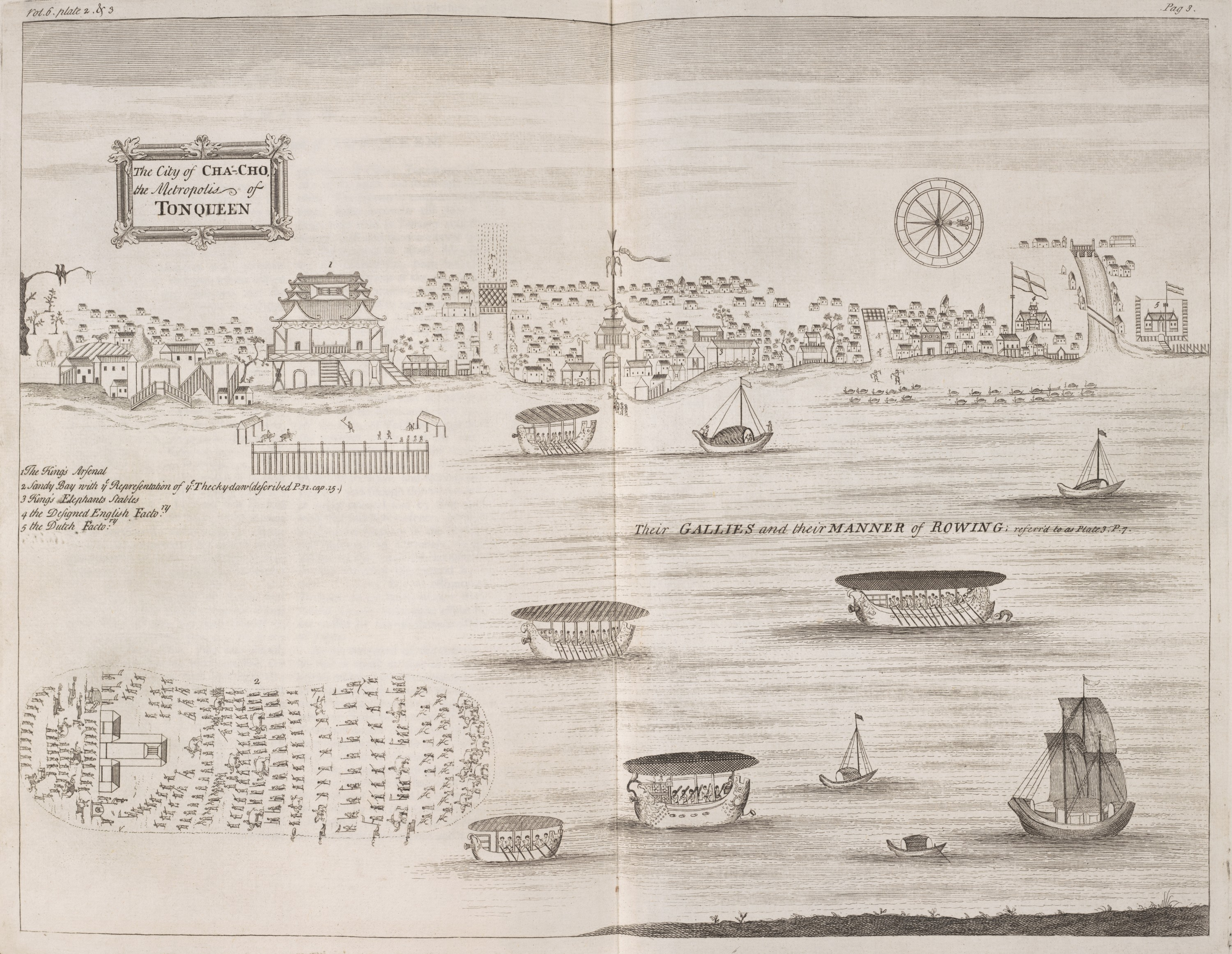
Vietnamese capital Đông Kinh or Hanoi in 1688 (viewing from the Red River)

A Japanese Red Seal Ship that conducted trade in Vietnam

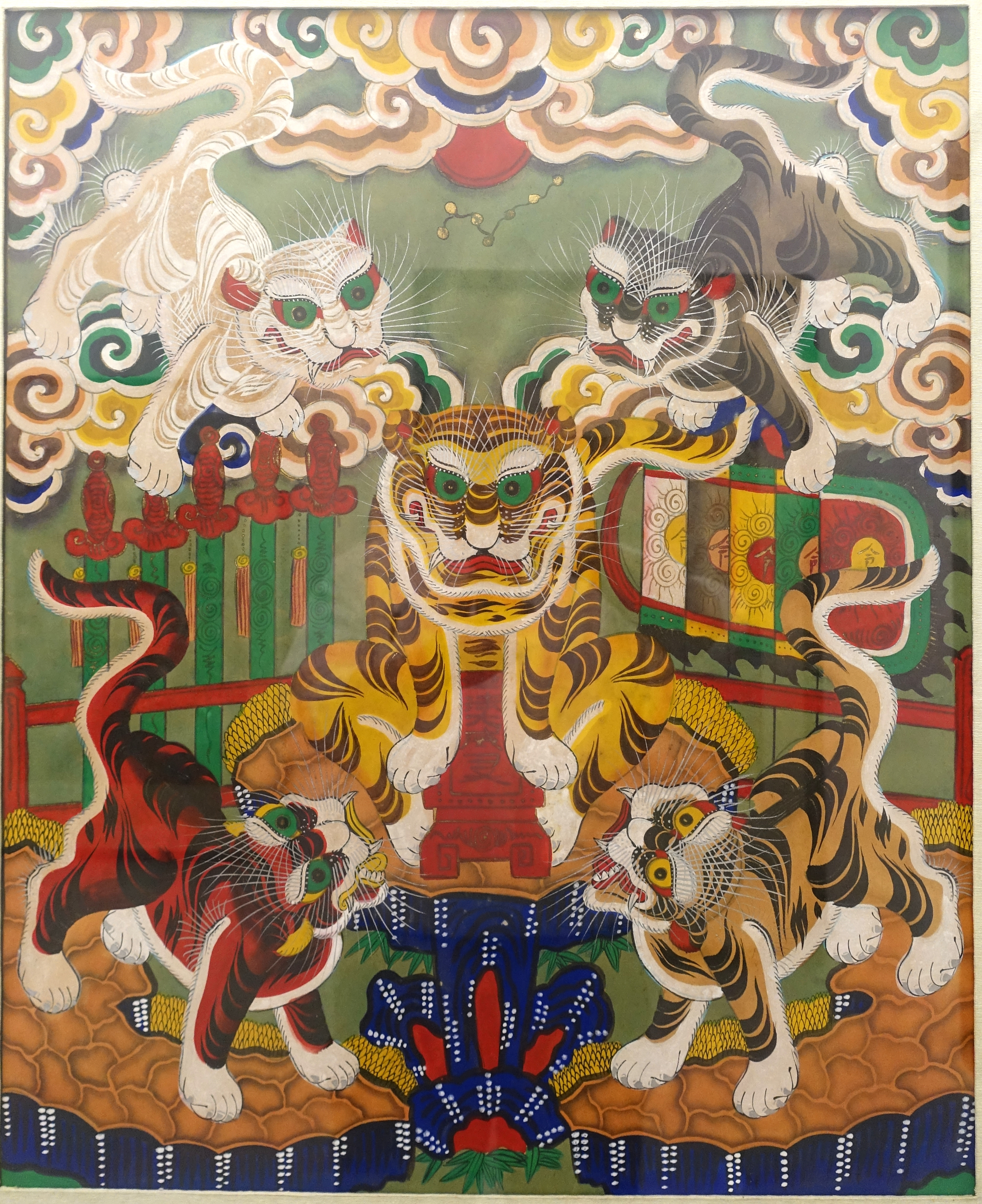
Five tigers by Hàng Trống painting, Hanoi, 17th century

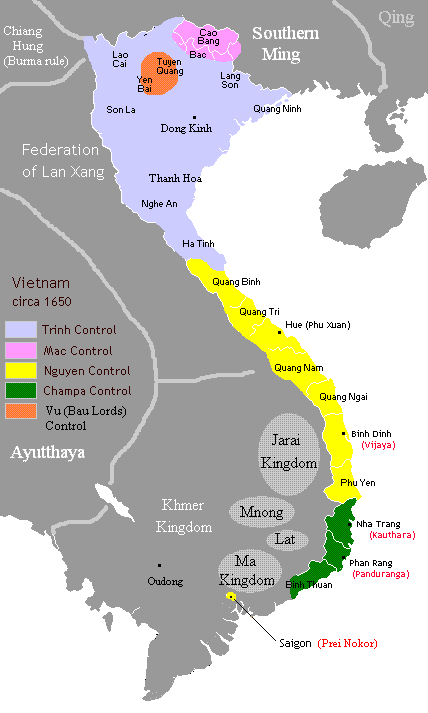
Map of Vietnam showing (roughly) the areas controlled by the Trịnh, Nguyễn, Mạc, and Champa around 1650. Violet: Trịnh Territory. Yellow: Nguyễn Territory. Green: Champa-Panduranga (under Nguyễn overlordship). Pink (Cao Bang): Mạc Territory. Orange: Vũ Lordship.

In the year 1600, Nguyễn Hoàng also declared himself Lord (officially "Vương", popularly "Chúa") and refused to send more money or soldiers to help the Trịnh. He also moved his capital to Phú Xuân, modern-day Huế. Nguyễn Hoàng died in 1613 after having ruled the south for 55 years. He was succeeded by his 6th son, Nguyễn Phúc Nguyên, who likewise refused to acknowledge the power of the Trịnh, yet still pledged allegiance to the Lê monarch.

Trịnh Tráng succeeded Trịnh Tùng, his father, upon his death in 1623. Tráng ordered Nguyễn Phúc Nguyên to submit to his authority. The order was refused twice. In 1627, Trịnh Tráng sent 150,000 troops southward in an unsuccessful military campaign. The Trịnh were much stronger, with a larger population, economy and army, but they were unable to vanquish the Nguyễn, who had built two defensive stone walls and invested in Portuguese artillery.

The Trịnh–Nguyễn War lasted from 1627 until 1672. The Trịnh army staged at least seven offensives, all of which failed to capture Phú Xuân. For a time, starting in 1651, the Nguyễn themselves went on the offensive and attacked parts of Trịnh territory. However, the Trịnh, under a new leader, Trịnh Tạc, forced the Nguyễn back by 1655. After one last offensive in 1672, Trịnh Tạc agreed to a truce with the Nguyễn Lord Nguyễn Phúc Tần.

As such, between 1600 and 1775, the two powerful families partitioned the country: the Nguyễn lords ruled Đàng Trong (the South), while the Trịnh lords controlled Đàng Ngoài (the North).

==== Advent of Europeans and southward expansion ====
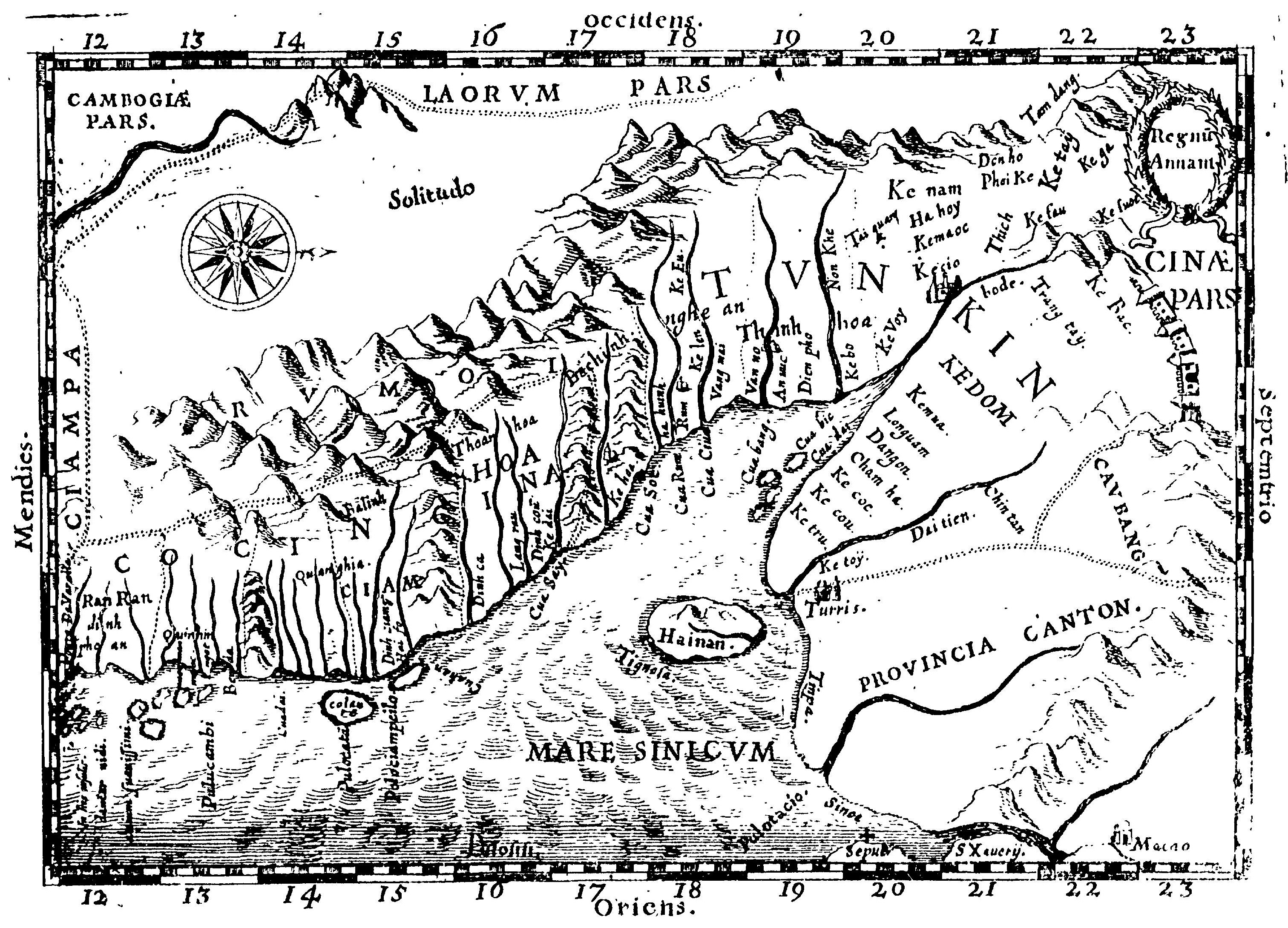
One of the earliest Western maps of Annam, published in 1651 by Alexandre de Rhodes (north is oriented to the right).

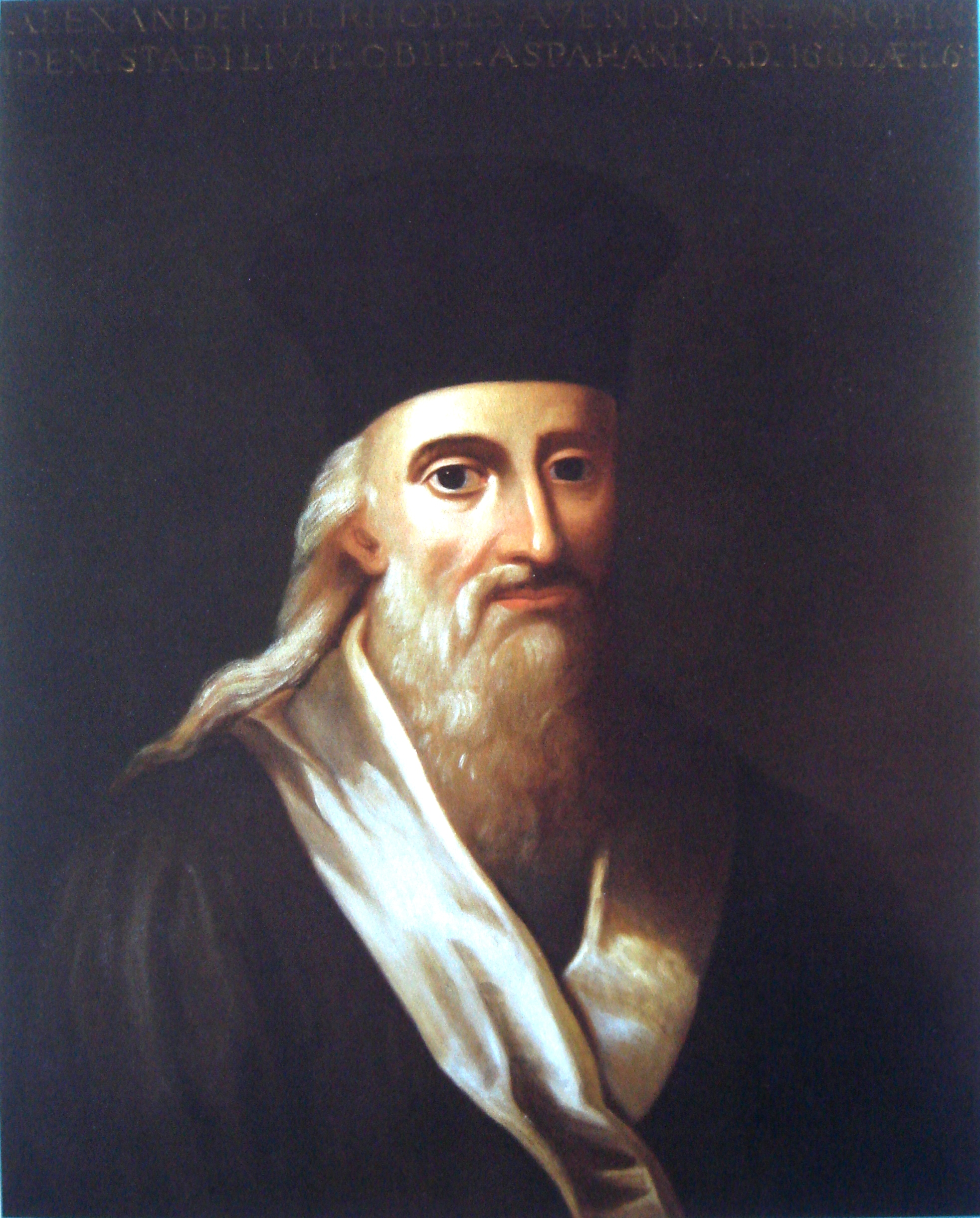
Alexandre de Rhodes, an influential Jesuit missionary in Vietnam.

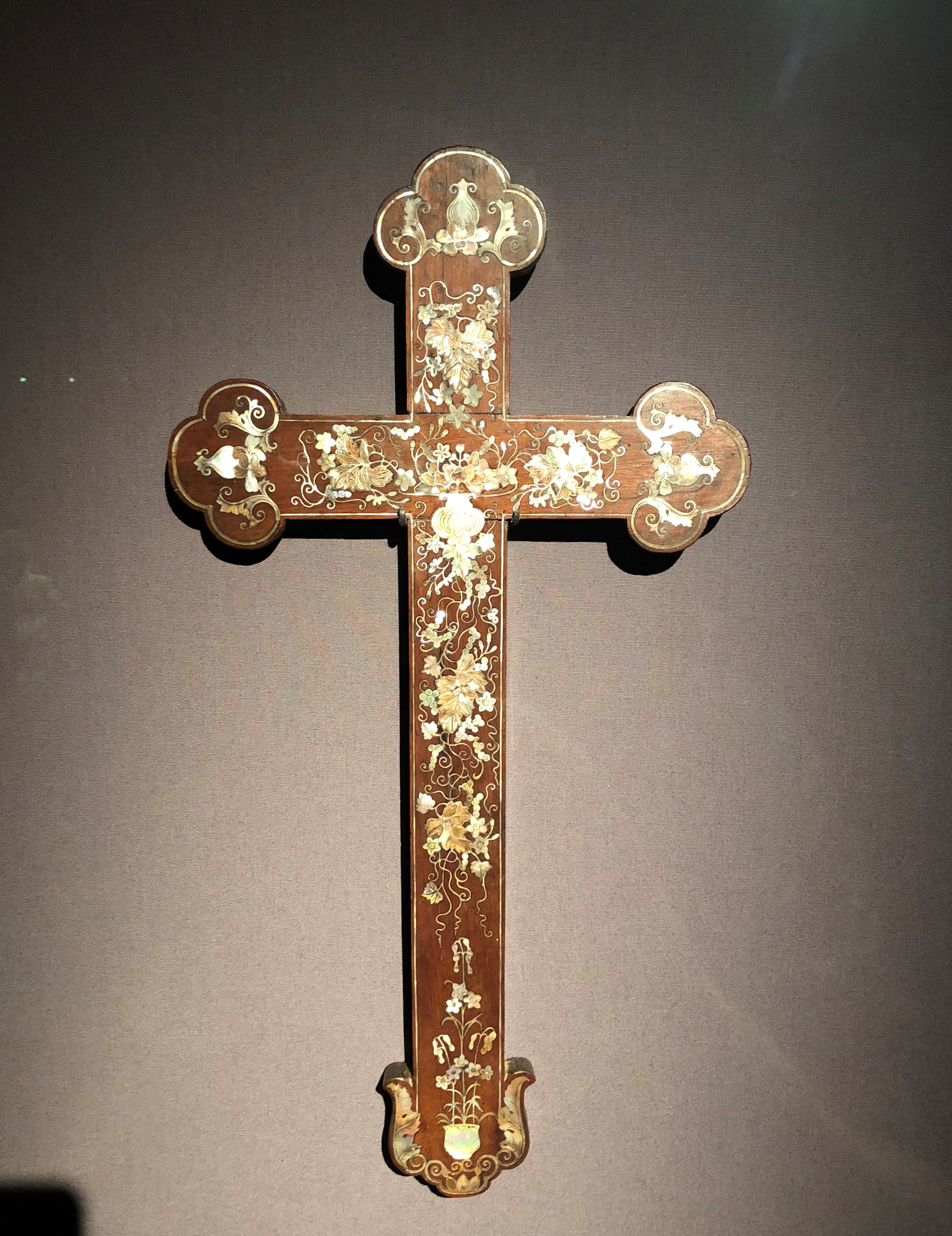
19th century Vietnamese Catholic cross

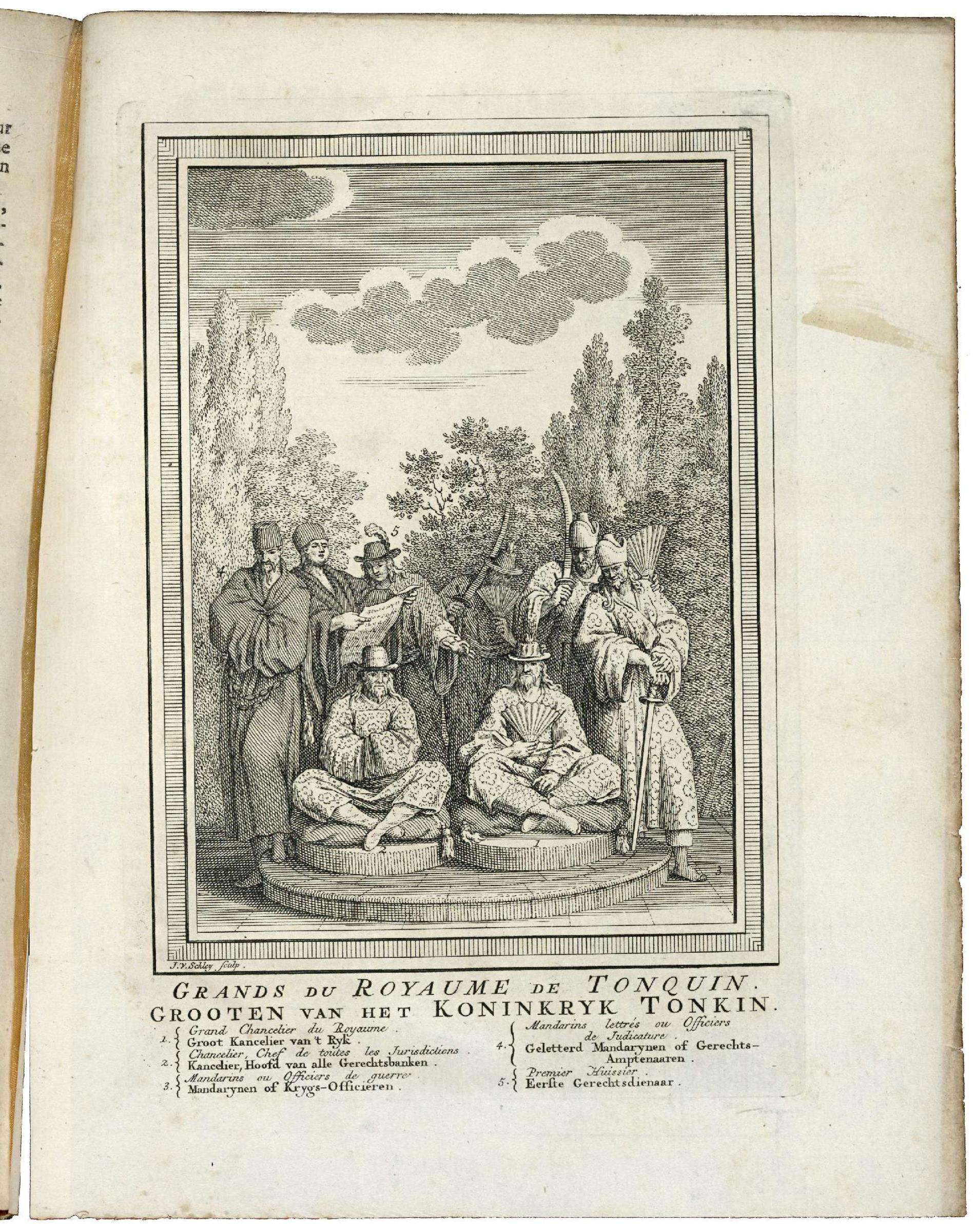
Dutch narration about North Vietnamese officials

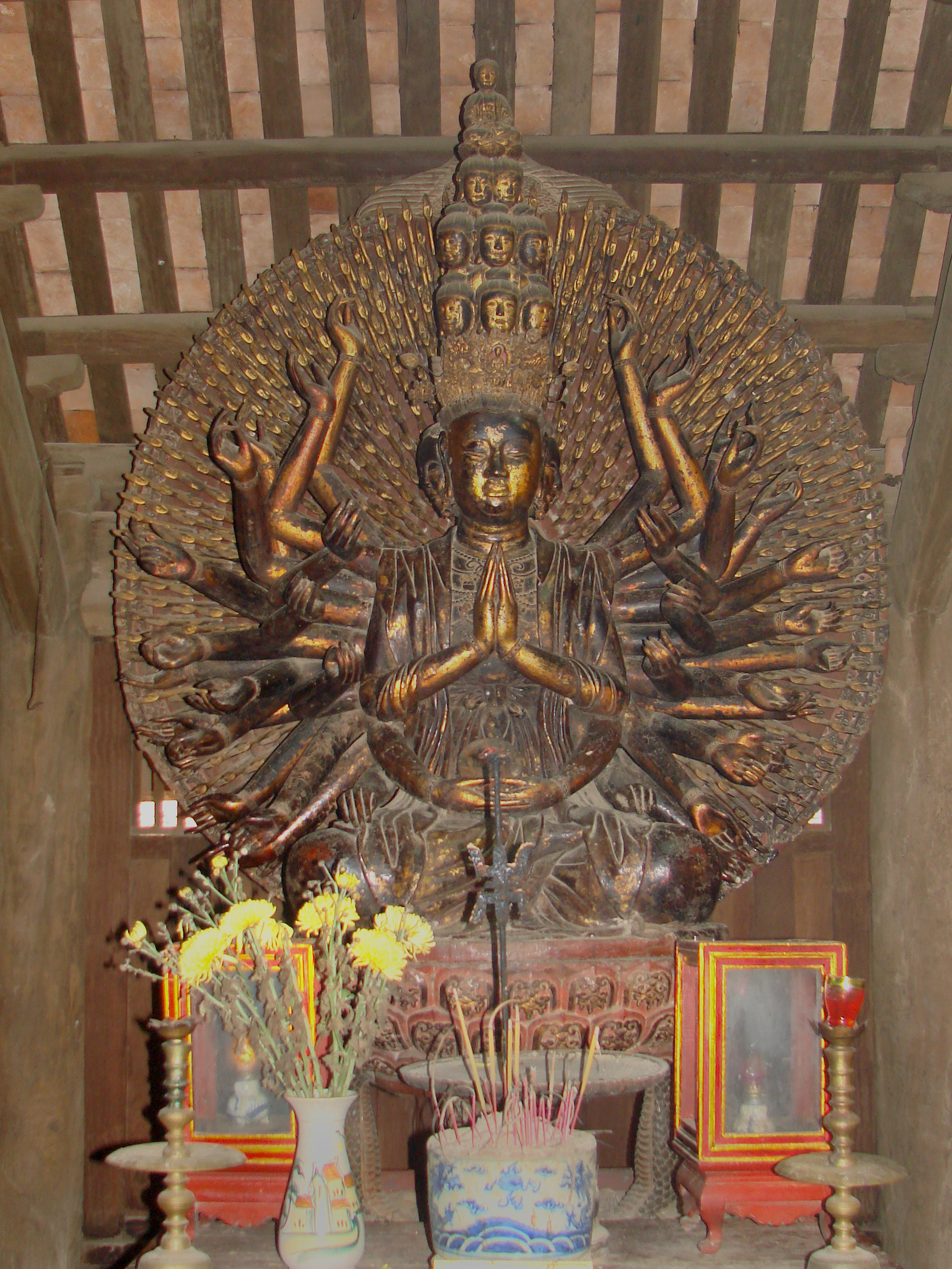
Thousand-arms-and-eyes Avalokiteśvara Bodhisattva wooden statue in Bút Tháp temple, Bắc Ninh province

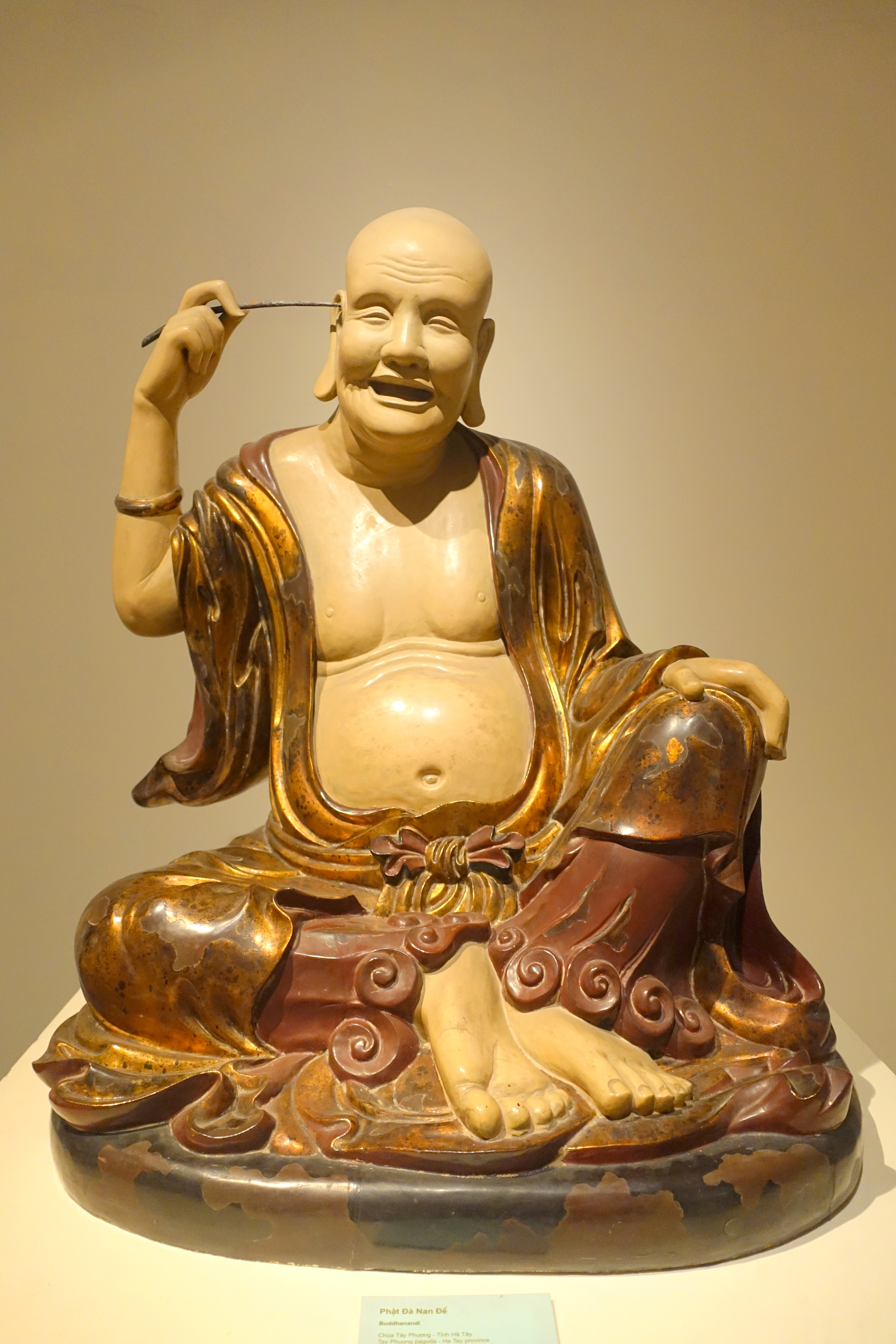
Buddhanandi statue of Tây Phương temple, Hanoi. Both are examples of highly-defined style of Vietnamese wood carving.

Contact between what is now Vietnam with the West may have dated back to 166 CE, started during the Roman Empire when a Roman envoy arrived to the Han court of Luoyang via Northern Vietnam.. Marco Polo visited Vietnam in 1292. The Portuguese started to arrived in 1516 and other European traders and missionaries in the 16th century. Jesuits in the 17th century established a solid foundation of Christianity in both domains of Đàng Ngoài (Tonkin) and Đàng Trong (Cochinchina). Alexandre de Rhodes, a missionary from the Papal States, improved on earlier work by Portuguese missionaries and developed the Vietnamese Romanized alphabet chữ Quốc ngữ in Dictionarium Annamiticum Lusitanum et Latinum in 1651. The Nôm works of Girolamo Maiorica are considered a milestone in the history of Vietnamese literature. For over two hundred years, the majority of Christian works in Vietnam were produced in chữ Nôm. The missionaries, primarily from Portugal, Italy, and Japan, played a key role in spreading the new faith. After four decades, the Jesuits were joined by the Paris Foreign Missions Society (MEP), Dominicans, Discalced Augustinians, and Franciscans from various Romance-speaking countries. By the end of the 18th century, Catholicism had become a firmly rooted part of Vietnam's spiritual and social landscape, particularly in Đàng Ngoài. In the Đàng Trong court, many missionaries held official roles as royal physicians, mathematicians, and astronomers, valued for their scientific knowledge.

Various European efforts to establish trading posts in Vietnam failed, but missionaries were allowed to operate for some time until the mandarins began concluding that Christianity (which had succeeded in converting up to a tenth of the population by 1700) was a threat to the Confucian social order since it condemned ancestor worship, among other practices. Vietnamese authorities' attitudes to Europeans and Christianity hardened as they began to increasingly see it as a way of undermining society while Catholics claimed that the authorities misunderstood their loyalism and patriotism.

The Trịnh–Nguyễn War gave European traders the opportunities to support each side with weapons and technology: the Portuguese assisted the Nguyễn in the South while the Dutch helped the Trịnh in the North. The Trịnh and the Nguyễn maintained a relative peace for the next hundred years, during which both sides made significant accomplishments. The Trịnh created centralized government offices in charge of state budget and producing currency, unified the weight units into a decimal system, established printing shops to reduce the need to import printed materials from China, opened a military academy, and compiled history books.

Meanwhile, the Nguyễn lords continued the southward expansion by the conquest of the remaining Cham land. Việt settlers also arrived in the sparsely populated area known as "Water Chenla", which was the lower Mekong Delta portion of the former Khmer Empire. Between the mid-17th century to the mid-18th century, as the former Khmer Empire was weakened by internal strife and Siamese invasions, the Nguyễn Lords used various means, political marriage, diplomatic pressure, political and military favors, to gain the area around present-day Saigon and the Mekong Delta. The Nguyễn army at times also clashed with the Siamese army to establish influence over the former Khmer Empire.

==== Tây Sơn rebellion (1778–1802) ====
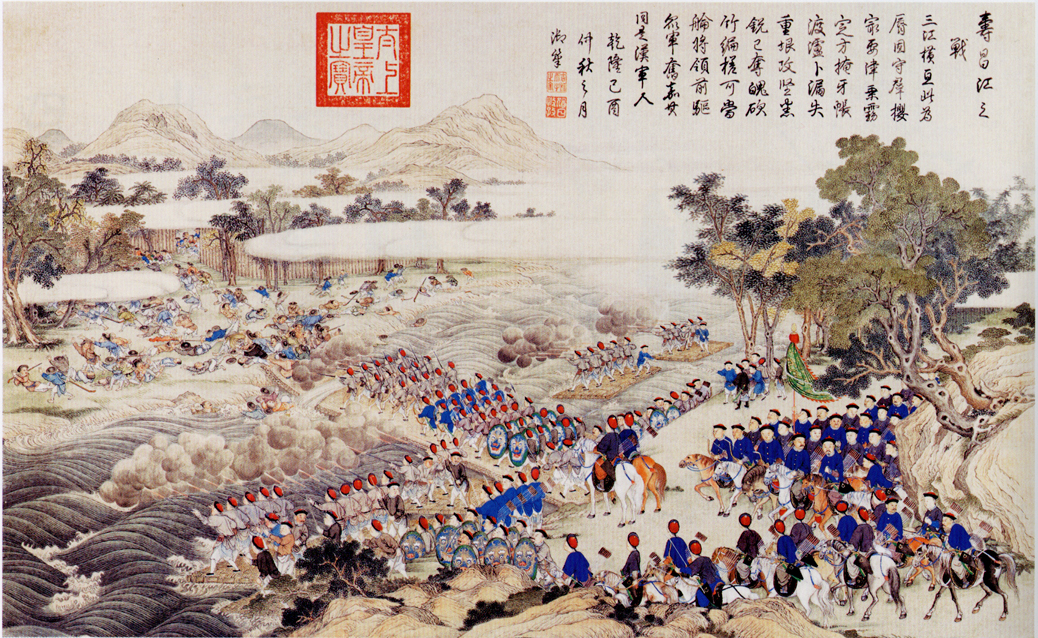
Battle of Thọ Xương river between Tây Sơn and Qing army in December 1788

In 1771, the Tây Sơn revolution broke out in Quy Nhon, which was under the control of the Nguyễn lord. The leaders of this revolution were three brothers named Nguyễn Nhạc, Nguyễn Lữ, and Nguyễn Huệ, not related to the Nguyễn lord's family. In 1773, Tây Sơn rebels took Quy Nhon as the capital of the revolution. Tây Sơn brothers' forces attracted many poor peasants, workers, Christians, ethnic minorities in the Central Highlands and Cham people who had been oppressed by the Nguyễn Lord for a long time, and also attracted to ethnic Chinese merchant class, who hope the Tây Sơn revolt will spare down the heavy tax policy of the Nguyễn Lord, however their contributions later were limited due to Tây Sơn's nationalist anti-Chinese sentiment. By 1776, the Tây Sơn had occupied all of the Nguyễn Lord's land and killed almost the entire royal family. The surviving prince Nguyễn Phúc Ánh (often called Nguyễn Ánh) fled to Siam, and obtained military support from the Siamese king. Nguyễn Ánh returned with 50,000 Siamese troops to regain power, but was defeated at the Battle of Rạch Gầm–Xoài Mút and almost killed. Nguyễn Ánh fled Vietnam, but he did not give up.

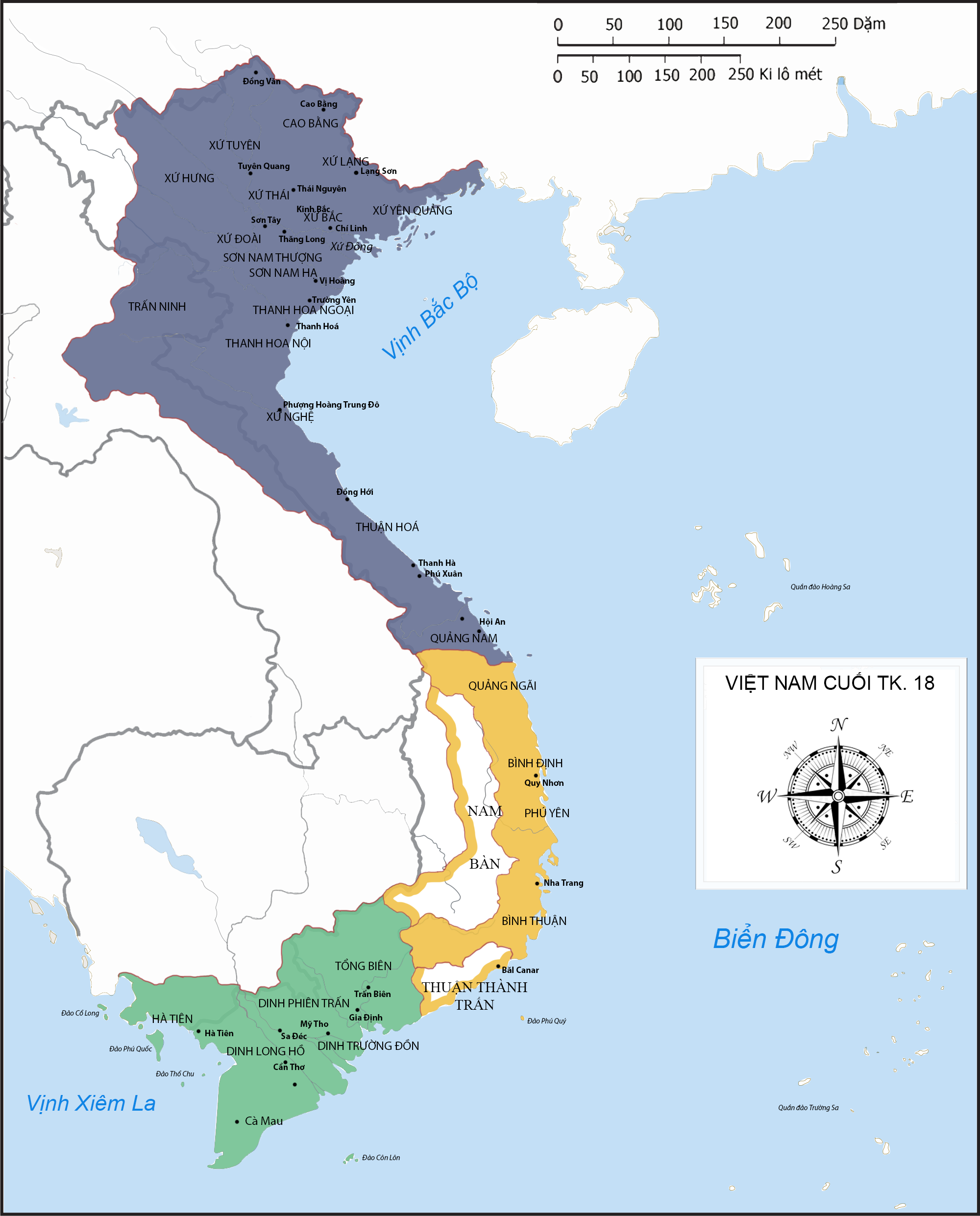
Vietnam, late 18th century.

The Tây Sơn army commanded by Nguyễn Huệ marched north in 1786 to fight the Trịnh Lord, Trịnh Khải. The Trịnh army failed and Trịnh Khải committed suicide. The Tây Sơn army captured the capital in less than two months. The last Lê emperor, Lê Chiêu Thống, fled to Qing China and petitioned the Qianlong Emperor in 1788 for help. The Qianlong Emperor supplied Lê Chiêu Thống with a massive army of around 200,000 troops to regain his throne from the usurper. In December 1788, Nguyễn Huệ–the third Tây Sơn brother–proclaimed himself Emperor Quang Trung and defeated the Qing troops with 100,000 men in a surprise 7-day campaign during the lunar new year (Tết). There was even a rumor saying that Quang Trung had also planned to conquer China, although it was unclear. During his reign, Quang Trung envisioned many reforms but died by unknown reason on the way march south in 1792, at the age of 40. During the reign of Emperor Quang Trung, Đại Việt was in fact divided into three political entities. The Tây Sơn leader, Nguyễn Nhạc, ruled the centre of the country from his capital Qui Nhơn. Emperor Quang Trung ruled the north from the capital Phú Xuân Huế. In the South, he officially funded and trained the Pirates of the South China Coast – one of the most strongest and feared pirate army in the world late 18th century – early 19th century. Nguyễn Ánh, assisted by many talented recruits from the South, captured Gia Định (Saigon) in 1788 and established a strong base for his force.

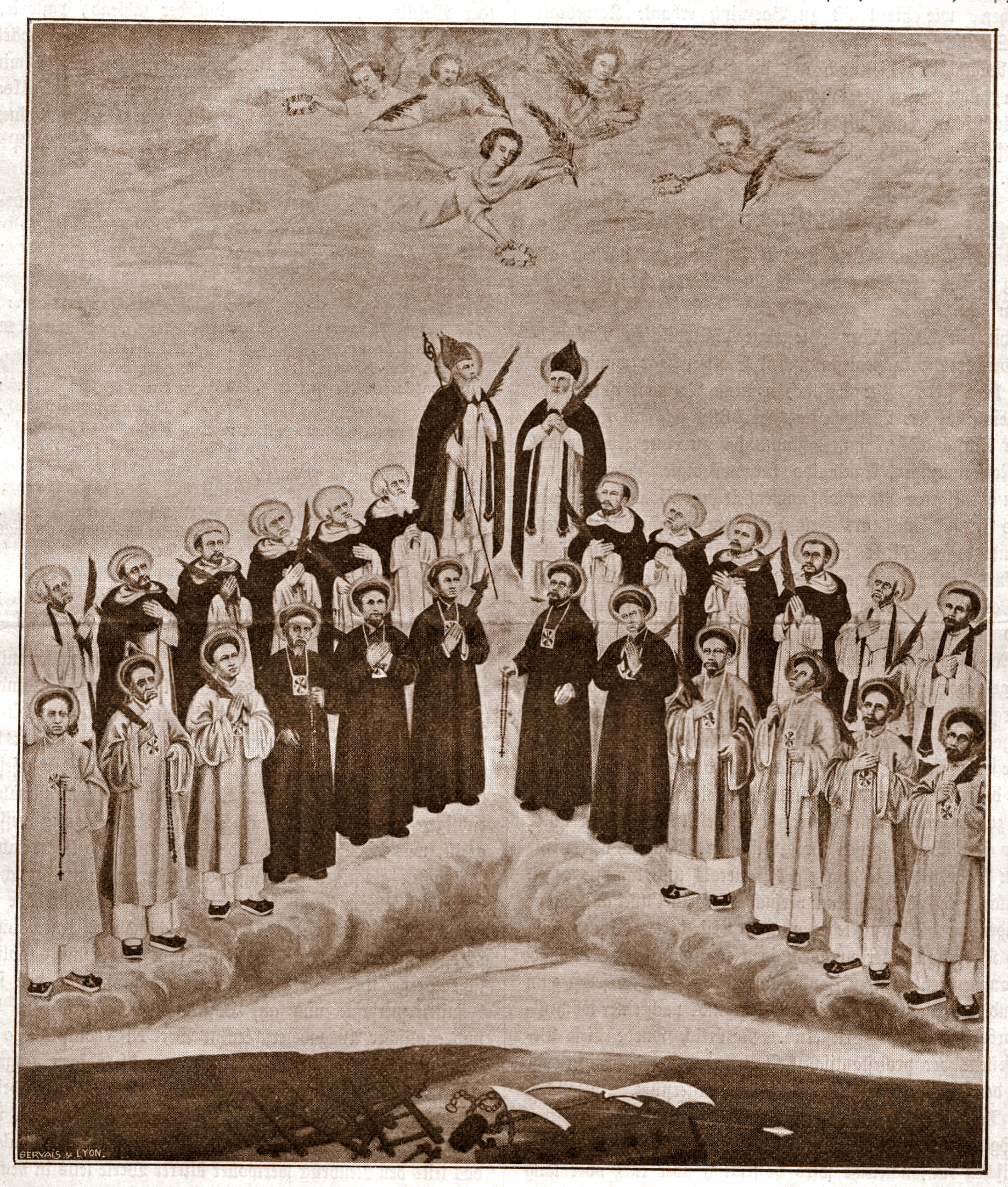
Many Catholic martyrs (believers and priests) were slain in Tonkin and Cochinchina during persecutions. 64 Martyrs were declared blessed in 1900 of whom 54 were natives; 26 of the martyrs were members of the Dominican Order.

In 1784, during the conflict between Nguyễn Ánh, the surviving heir of the Nguyễn lords, and the Tây Sơn dynasty, a French Roman Catholic prelate, Pigneaux de Behaine, sailed to France to seek military backing for Nguyễn Ánh. At Louis XVI's court, Pigneaux brokered the Little Treaty of Versailles which promised French military aid in exchange for Vietnamese concessions. However, because of the French Revolution, Pigneaux's plan failed to materialize. He went to the French territory of Pondichéry (India), and secured two ships, a regiment of Indian troops, and a handful of volunteers and returned to Vietnam in 1788. One of Pigneaux's volunteers, Jean-Marie Dayot, reorganized Nguyễn Ánh's navy along European lines and defeated the Tây Sơn at Quy Nhon in 1792. A few years later, Nguyễn Ánh's forces captured Saigon, where Pigneaux died in 1799. Another volunteer, Victor Olivier de Puymanel would later build the Gia Định fort in central Saigon.

After Quang Trung's death in September 1792, the Tây Sơn court became unstable as the remaining brothers fought against each other and against the people who were loyal to Nguyễn Huệ's young son. Quang Trung's 10-years-old son Nguyễn Quang Toản succeeded the throne, became Cảnh Thịnh Emperor, the third ruler of the Tây Sơn dynasty. In the South, lord Nguyễn Ánh and the Nguyễn royalists were assisted with French, Chinese, Siamese and Christian supports, sailed north in 1799, capturing Tây Sơn's stronghold Quy Nhon. In 1801, his force took Phú Xuân, the Tây Sơn capital. Nguyễn Ánh finally won the war in 1802, when he sieged Thăng Long (Hanoi) and executed Nguyễn Quang Toản, along with many Tây Sơn royals, generals and officials. Nguyễn Ánh ascended the throne and called himself Emperor Gia Long. Gia is for Gia Định, the old name of Saigon; Long is for Thăng Long, the old name of Hanoi. Hence Gia Long implied the unification of the country. The Nguyễn dynasty lasted until Bảo Đại's abdication in 1945. As China for centuries had referred to Đại Việt as Annam, Gia Long asked the Manchu Qing emperor to rename the country, from Annam to Nam Việt. To prevent any confusion of Gia Long's kingdom with Zhao Tuo's ancient kingdom, the Manchu emperor reversed the order of the two words to Việt Nam. The name Vietnam is thus known to be used since Emperor Gia Long's reign. Recently historians have found that this name had existed in older books in which Vietnamese referred to their country as Vietnam.

The Period of Division with its many tragedies and dramatic historical developments inspired many poets and gave rise to some Vietnamese masterpieces in verse, including the epic poem The Tale of Kiều (Truyện Kiều) by Nguyễn Du, Song of a Soldier's Wife (Chinh Phụ Ngâm) by Đặng Trần Côn and Đoàn Thị Điểm, and a collection of satirical, erotically charged poems by a female poet, Hồ Xuân Hương.

=== Nguyễn dynasty (1802–1945) ===
==== Unified Vietnam period (1802–1862) ====
Nguyễn Vietnam (1802–1945)

Vietnam in 1838

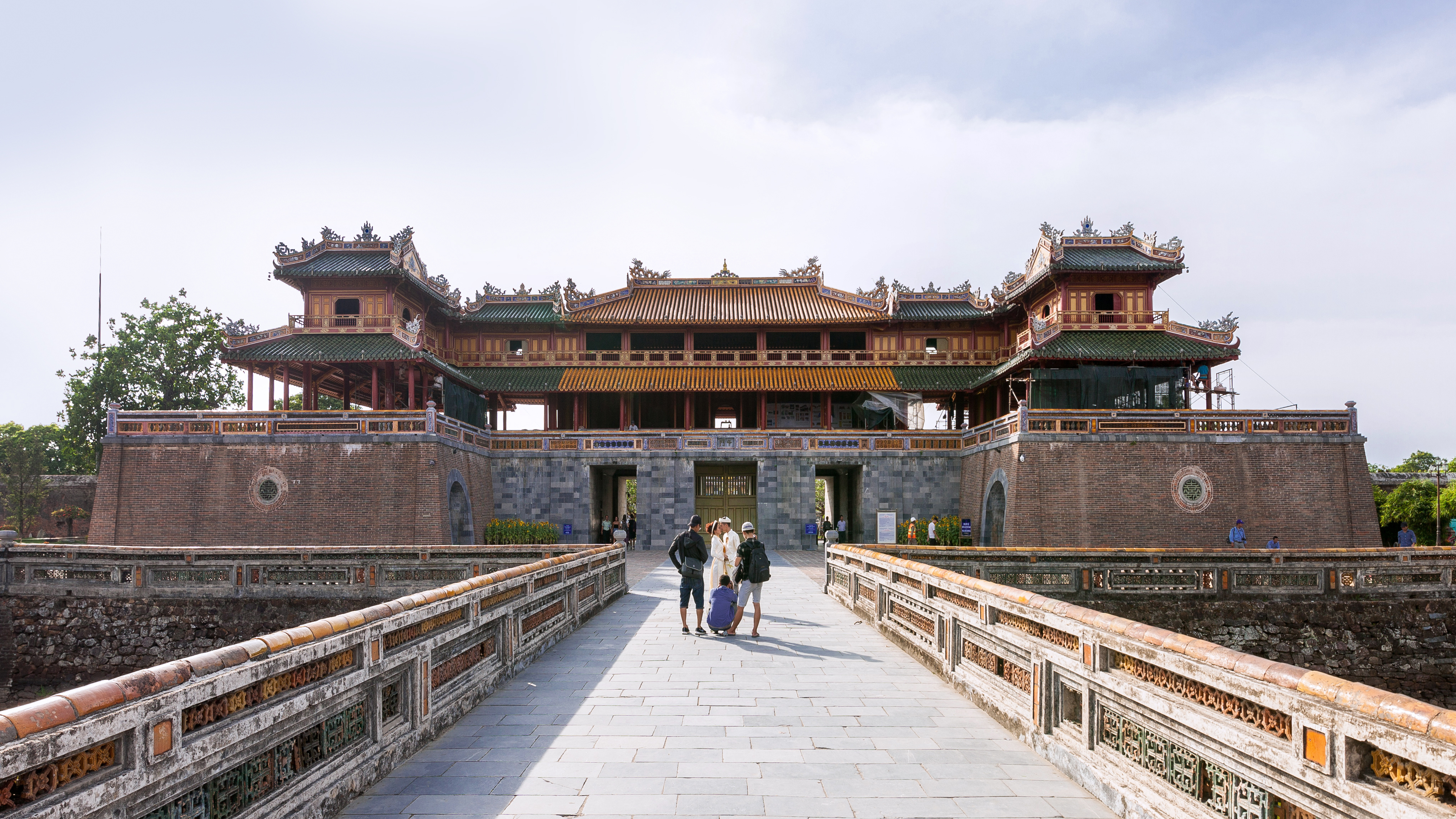
Meridian Gate of Imperial City of Huế, a UNESCO World Heritage Site.

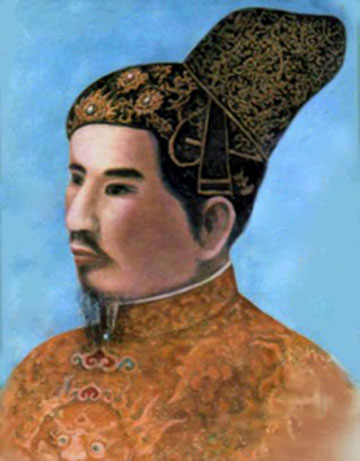
Emperor Gia Long (r. 1802–1820)

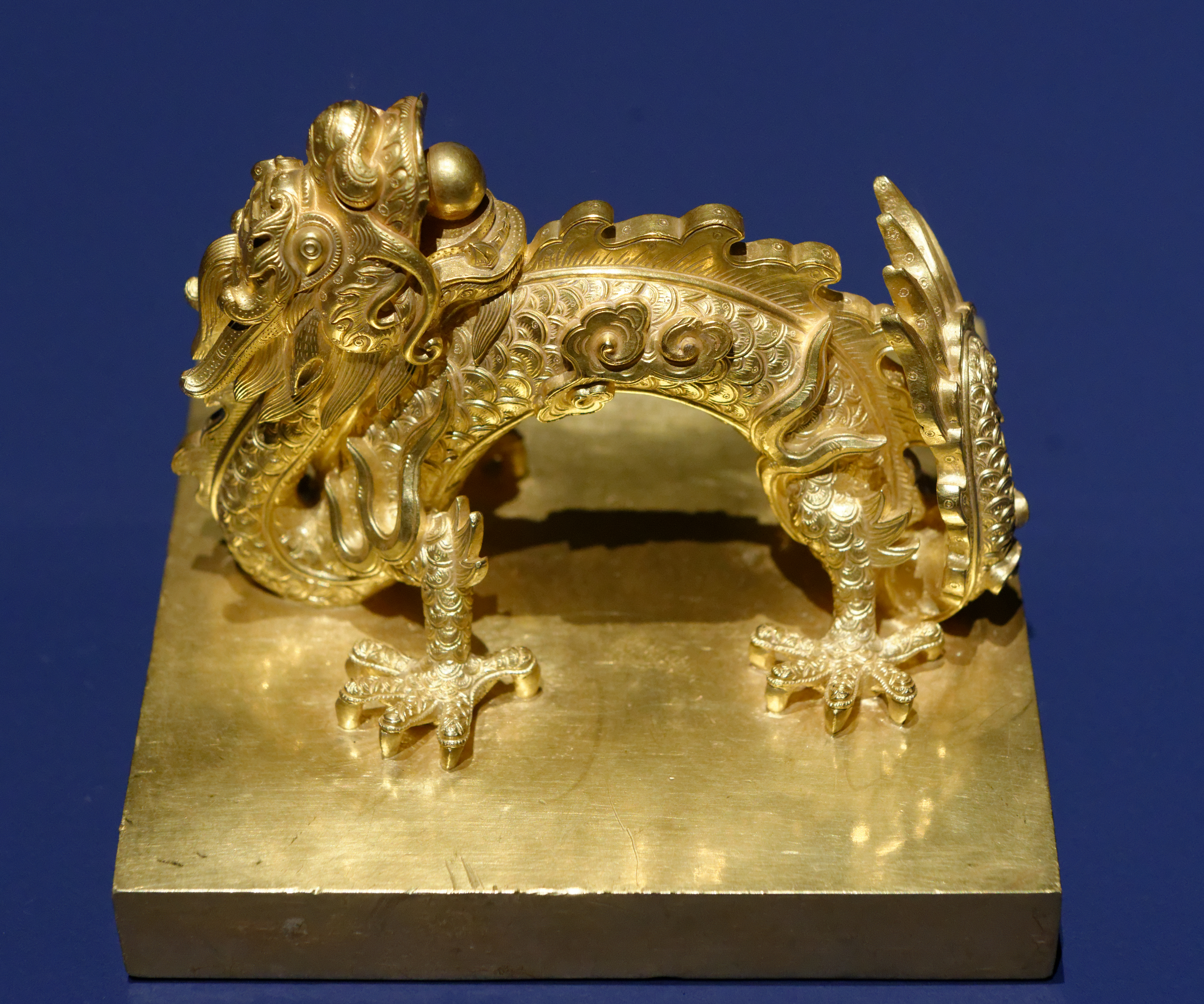
Seal of Emperor Gia Long

After defeating the Tây Sơn, Gia Long unified Vietnam under the Nguyễn dynasty in 1802. The early Nguyễn emperors had engaged in many of the constructive activities of its predecessors, building roads, digging canals, issuing a legal code, holding examinations, sponsoring care facilities for the sick, compiling maps and history books, and exerting influence over Cambodia and Laos.

Gia Long tolerated Catholicism and employed some Europeans in his court as advisors. His successors were more conservative Confucians and resisted Westernization. Minh Mạng began centralizing his authority according to neo-Confucian principles and sought to neutralize Catholic influence. Minh Mạng, as well as the succeeding Nguyễn emperors Thiệu Trị and Tự Đức, brutally suppressed Catholicism and pursued a 'closed-door' policy, perceiving the Westerners as a threat, following events such as the Lê Văn Khôi revolt when a French missionary, Joseph Marchand, was accused of encouraging local Catholics to revolt in an attempt to install a Catholic emperor. Catholics, both Vietnamese and foreign-born, were persecuted in retaliation. There were frequent uprisings against the Nguyễns, with hundreds of such events being recorded in the annals. Trade with the West slowed during this period. The persecution of Catholics and the imposition of trade embargoes were soon used as excuses for France to invade Vietnam.

==== Relations with China ====
According to a 2018 study in the Journal of Conflict Resolution covering Vietnam-China relations from 1365 to 1841, the relations could be characterized as a "hierarchic tributary system". The study found that "the Vietnamese court explicitly recognized its unequal status in its relations with China through a number of institutions and norms. Vietnamese rulers also displayed very little military attention to their relations with China. Rather, Vietnamese leaders were clearly more concerned with quelling chronic domestic instability and managing relations with kingdoms to their south and west."

== French colonial period (1862–1945) ==
=== French conquest of Vietnam (1858–1887) ===
French conquest of Vietnam (1858–1885)

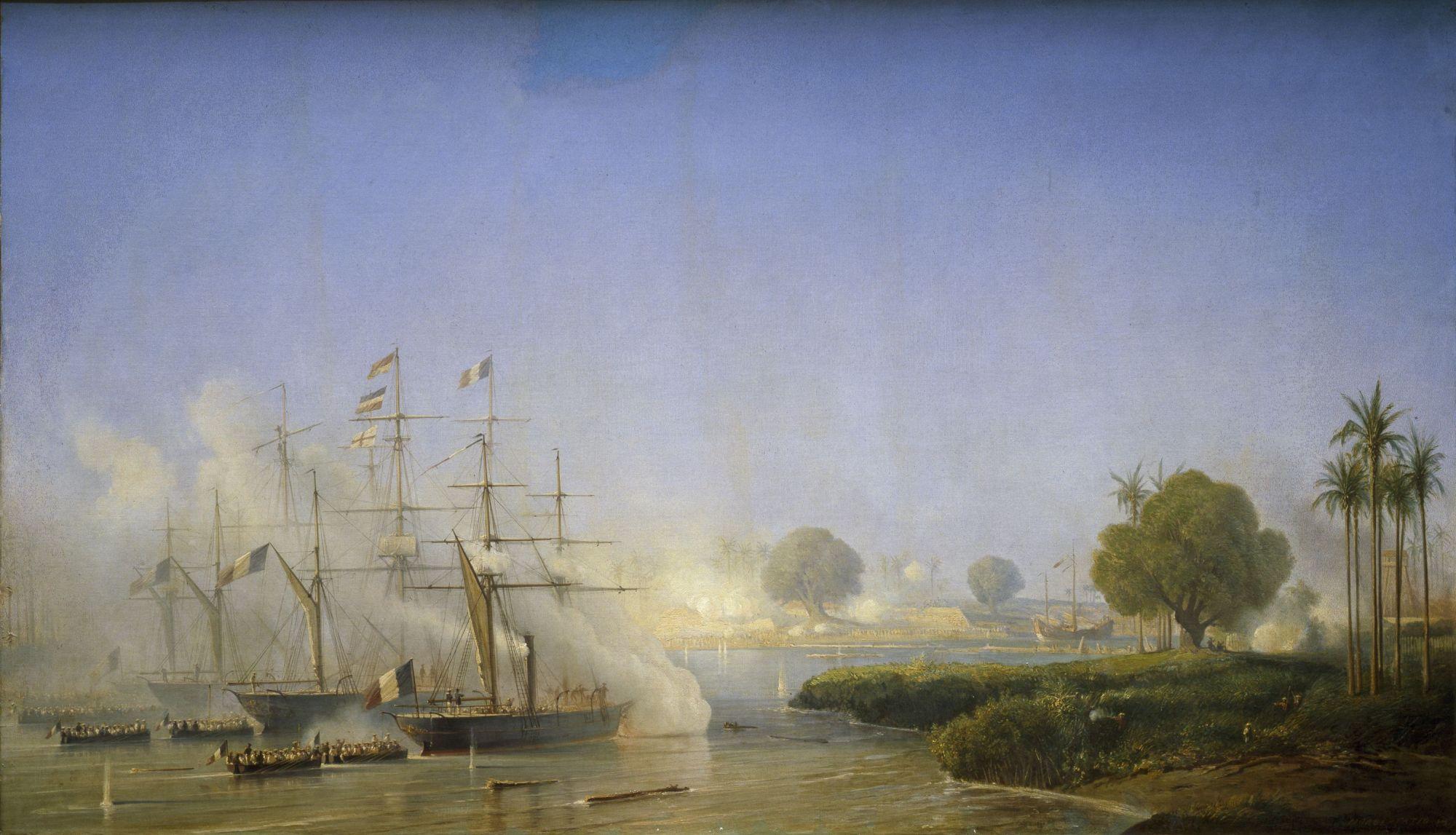
Franco-Spanish fleet attacking Saigon, February 1859

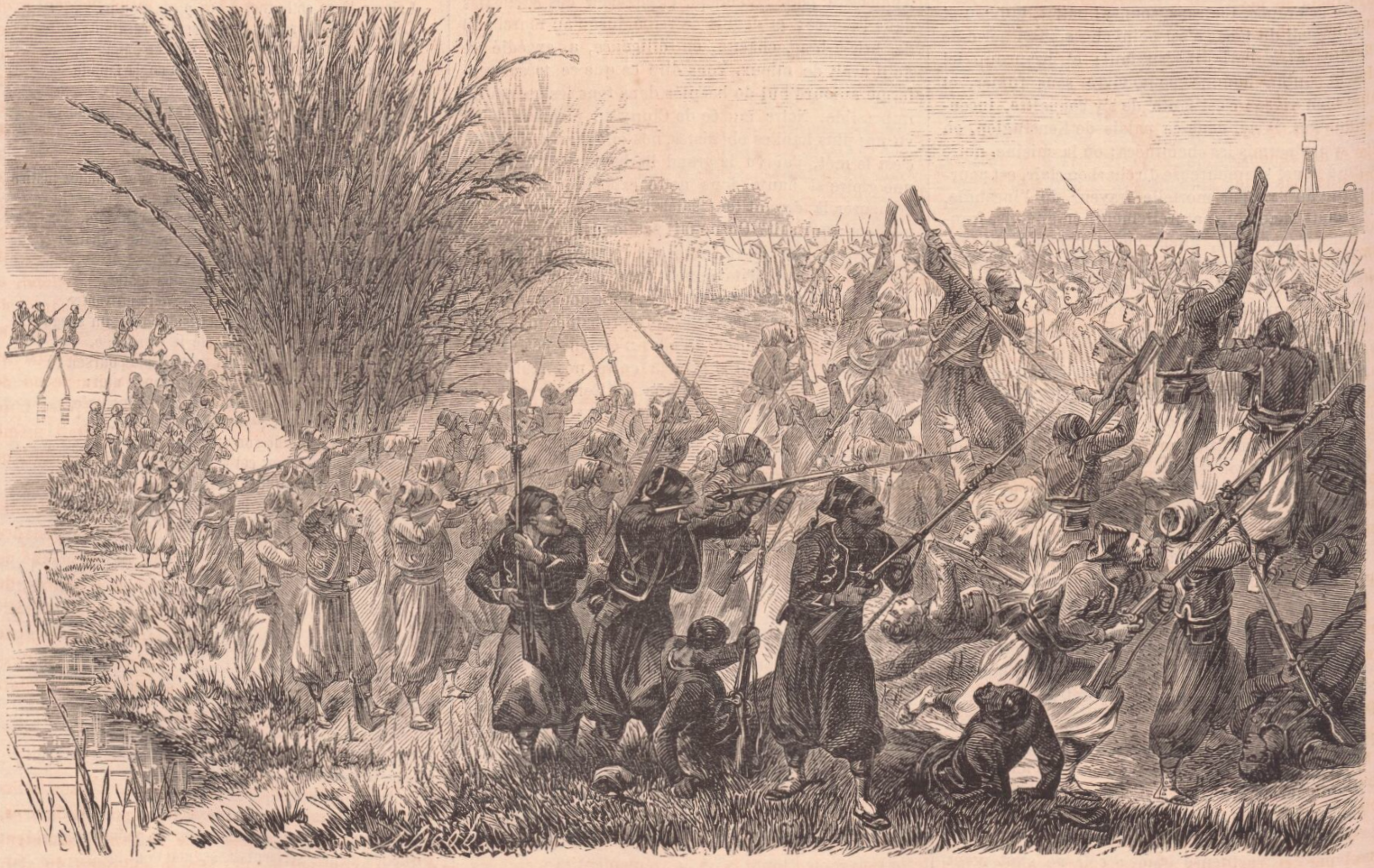
Zouaves battling Vietnamese for Saigon outskirts, 1859

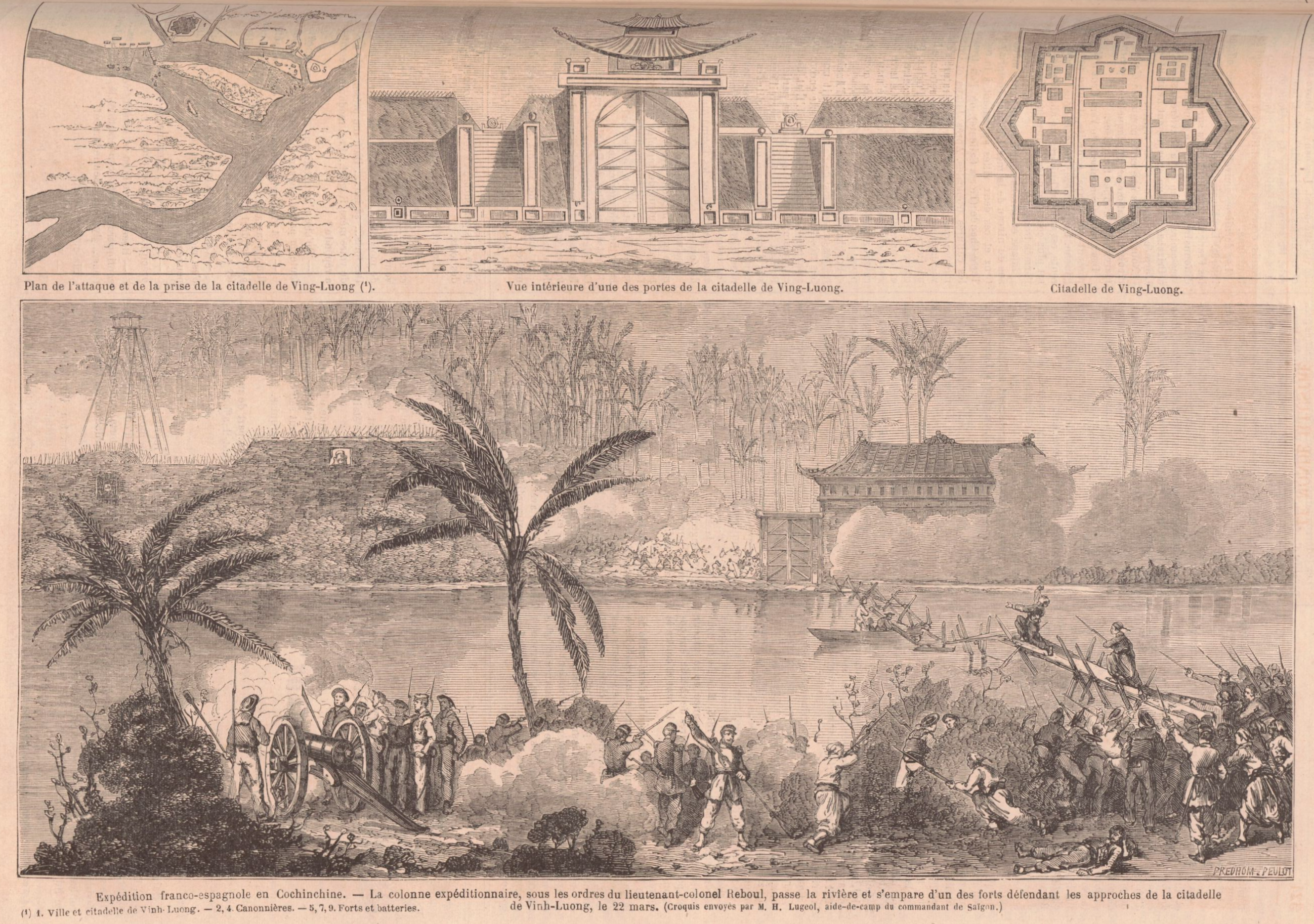
Franco-Spanish force capturing Vĩnh Long, March 1862

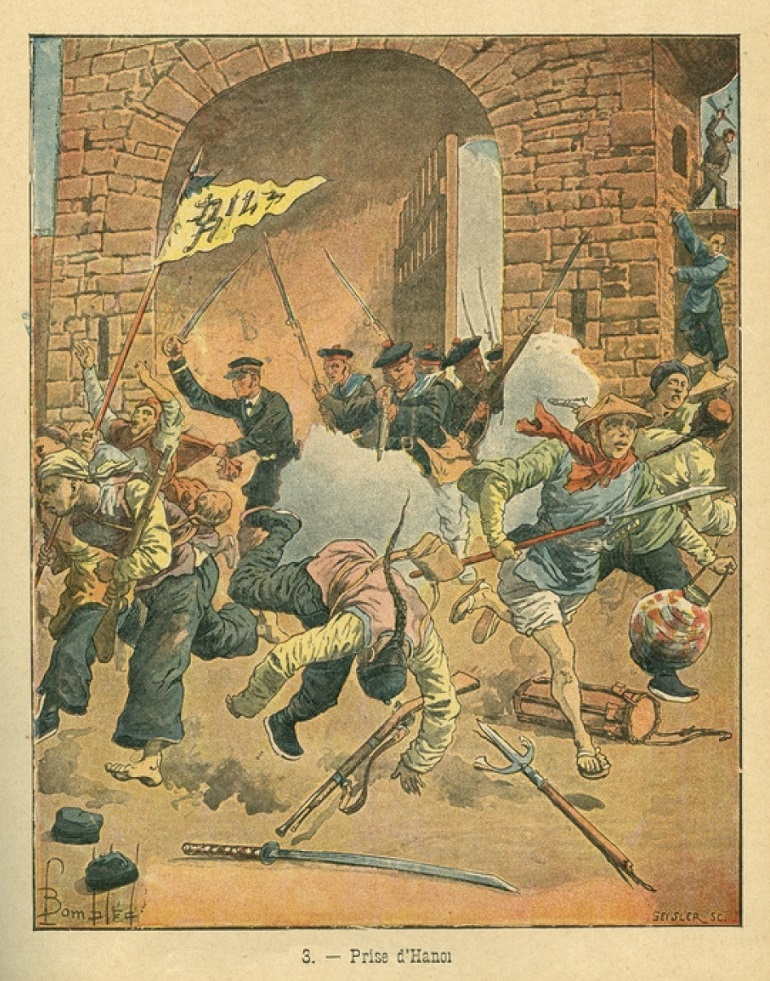
French troops capturing Hanoi, November 1873

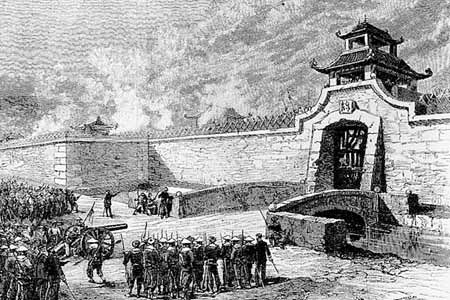
French artillery preparing to blow up the gate of Hanoi, April 1882

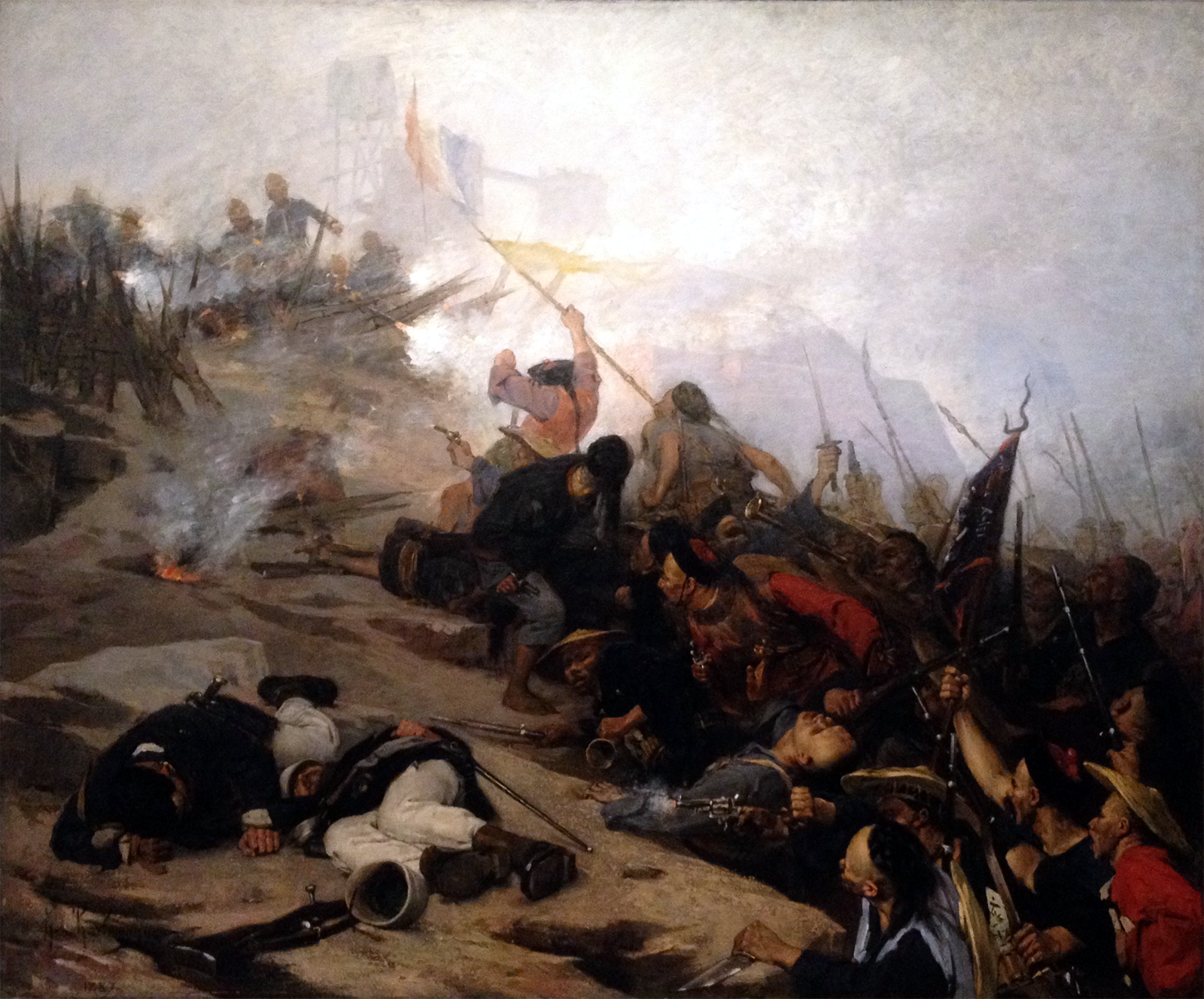
Chinese assault during Siege of Tuyên Quang, Sino-French War, February 1885

The French colonial empire was heavily involved in Vietnam in the 19th century; often French intervention was undertaken to protect the work of the Paris Foreign Missions Society in the country. In response to many incidents in which Catholic missionaries were persecuted, harassed and in some cases executed, and also to expand French influence in Asia, Napoleon III ordered Charles Rigault de Genouilly with 14 French gunships to attack the port of Đà Nẵng (Tourane) in 1858. The attack caused significant damage, yet failed to gain any foothold, in the process being afflicted by the humidity and tropical diseases. De Genouilly decided to sail south and captured the poorly defended city of Gia Định (Saigon). From 1859 during the Siege of Saigon to 1867, French colonial troops expanded their control over all six provinces on the Mekong delta and formed a colony known as Cochinchina.

A few years later, French troops landed in Northern Vietnam (which they called Tonkin) and captured Hà Nội twice in 1873 and 1882. The French managed to keep their grip on Tonkin although, twice, their top commanders Francis Garnier and Henri Rivière, were ambushed and killed fighting pirates of the Black Flag Army hired by the mandarins. The Nguyễn dynasty surrendered to France via the Treaty of Huế (1883), marking the colonial era (1883–1954) in the history of Vietnam. France assumed control over the whole of Vietnam after the Tonkin Campaign (1883–1886). French Indochina was formed in October 1887 from Annam (Trung Kỳ, central Vietnam), Tonkin (Bắc Kỳ, northern Vietnam) and Cochinchina (Nam Kỳ, southern Vietnam), with Cambodia and Laos added in 1893. Within French Indochina, Cochinchina had the status of a colony, Annam and Tonkin were nominally two French protectorates where the Nguyễn dynasty still de jure ruled.

Flag of the Vietnamese Nguyễn dynasty during French rule, 1920–45.

After the Vietnamese Nguyễn dynasty lost Gia Định, the island of Poulo Condor, and three southern provinces to France with the Treaty of Saigon signed between the Nguyễn dynasty, Spain, and France in 1862, many resistance movements in the south refused to recognize the treaty and continued to fight the French, some led by former court officers, such as Trương Định, some by farmers and other rural people, such as Nguyễn Trung Trực, who sank the French gunship L'Esperance using guerilla tactics. In the north, most movements were led by former court officers, and fighters were from the rural population. Sentiment against the invasion ran deep in the countryside—well over 90 percent of the population—because the French seized and exported most of the rice, creating widespread malnutrition from the 1880s onward. And, an ancient tradition existed of repelling all invaders. These were two reasons that the vast majority opposed the French invasion. However, Vietnam still became two protectorates ruled by France in 1883, confirmed by the Treaty of Huế (1884).

Some of the resistance movements lasted decades, with Phan Đình Phùng fighting in Central Vietnam until 1896, and in the northern mountains, former bandit leader Hoàng Hoa Thám fought until 1911. Even the teenage Nguyễn Emperor Hàm Nghi left the Imperial Palace of Huế in 1885 with regent Tôn Thất Thuyết and started the Cần Vương ("Save the King") movement, trying to rally the people to resist the French. He was captured in November 1888 and exiled to French Algeria.

In Cambodia, which was also part of Indochina like Vietnam, the French restored the Kingdom of Cambodia as a Protectorate from its previous invader, Thailand, which had invaded and devastated the country. This act also fulfilled a past promise by Spanish-Philippines to restore Cambodia, a promise that was ultimately realized by the French and Vietnamese, and both peoples being mostly Catholics. In 1887, Vietnamese protectorates and Cochinchina colony became parts of the French Indochinese Federation.

Guerrillas of the Văn Thân movement and Cần Vương movement killed around a third of Vietnam's Christian population during the resistance war. Decades later, two more Nguyễn emperors, Thành Thái and Duy Tân were also exiled to Africa for having anti-French tendencies. The former was deposed on the pretext of insanity and Duy Tân was caught in a conspiracy with the mandarin Trần Cao Vân trying to start an uprising. However, lack of modern weapons and equipment prevented these resistance movements from being able to engage the French in open combat. The various anti-French insurgencies started by mandarins were carried out with the primary goal of restoring the old feudal society. However, by 1900 a new generation of Vietnamese were coming of age who had never lived in precolonial Vietnam. These young activists were as eager as their grandparents to see independence restored, but they realized that returning to the feudal order was not feasible and that modern technology and governmental systems were needed. Having been exposed to Western philosophy, they aimed to establish a republic upon independence, departing from the royalist sentiments of the Cần Vương movements. Some of them set up Vietnamese independence societies in Japan, which many viewed as a model society (i.e. an Asian nation that had modernized, but retained its own culture and institutions).

=== French Indochina and Vietnamese nationalism (1887–1945) ===
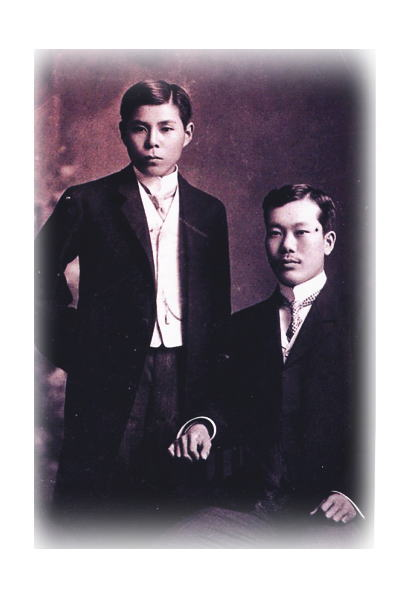
Phan Bội Châu (seating) and prince Cường Để in Japan, c. 1907

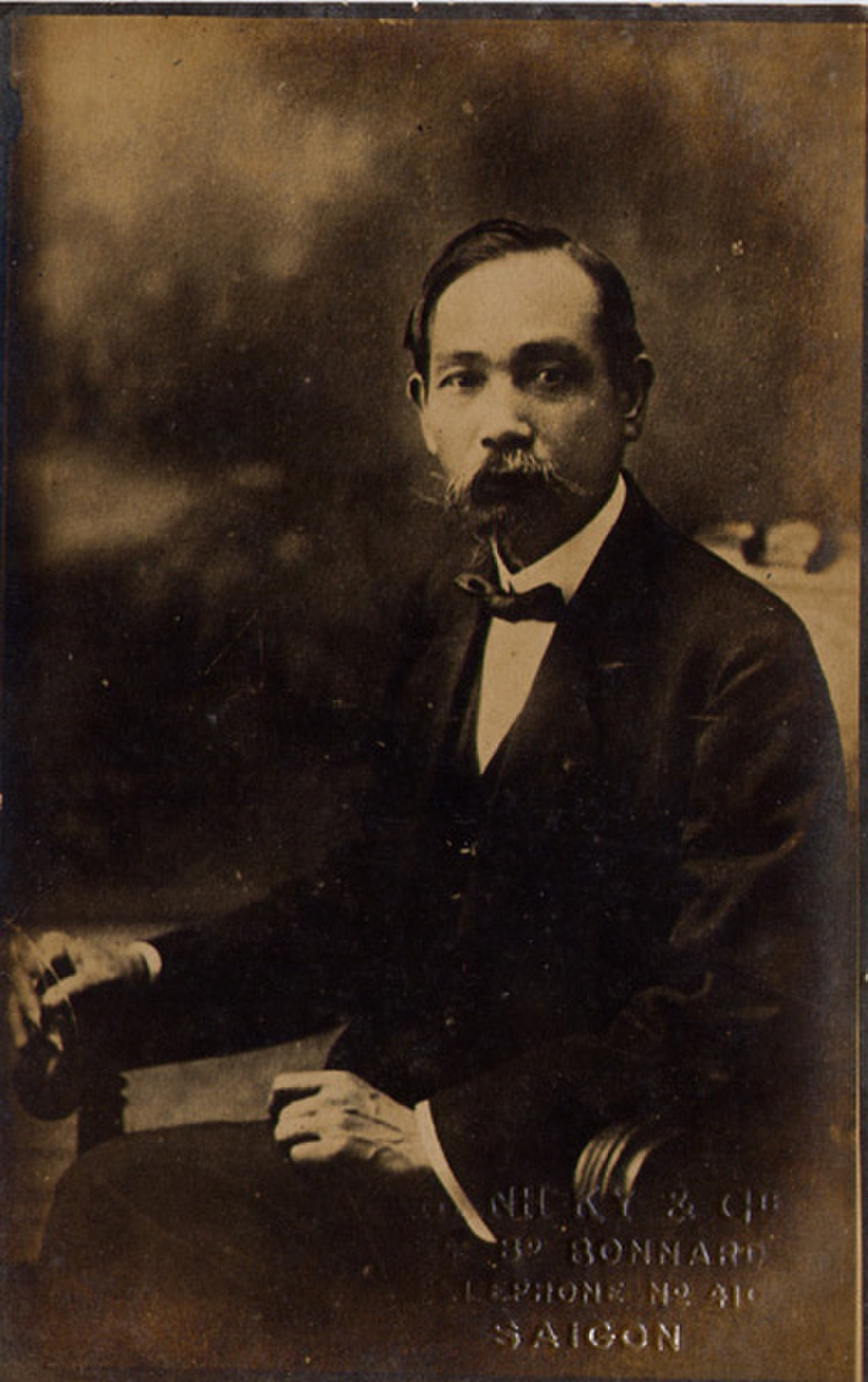
Phan Châu Trinh, a leader of the Vietnamese independence movement who favored nonviolent democratic processes

There emerged two parallel movements of modernization. The first was the Đông Du ("Travel to the East") Movement started in 1905 by Phan Bội Châu. Châu's plan was to send Vietnamese students to the Empire of Japan to learn modern skills, so that in the future they could lead a successful armed revolt against the French. With Prince Cường Để, he started two organizations in Japan: Duy Tân Hội and Việt Nam Công Hiến Hội. Due to French diplomatic pressure, Japan later deported Châu. Phan Châu Trinh, who favored a peaceful, non-violent struggle to gain independence, led a second movement, Duy Tân Movement (vi., "Modernization"), which stressed education for the masses, modernizing the country, developing economy, fostering understanding and tolerance between the French and the Vietnamese, and peaceful transitions of power. In 1907, he and associates Lương Văn Can, Nguyễn Quyền opened a patriotic modern school in Hanoi for young Vietnamese men and women. The school was called Tonkin Free School (Vietnamese: Đông Kinh Nghĩa Thục), used new translated books like Kang Youwei's Datong Shu and Liang Qichao's Ice-Drinker's studio Collection (Vietnamese: Lương Khải Siêu – Đại đồng Thư, Khang Hữu Vi – Ẩm Băng thất Tùng thư) . He was a lecturer at the school, and Sào Nam's writings were also used. Lương Văn Can was the headteacher, Nguyễn Quyền was the school supervisor. Nguyễn Văn Vĩnh, Phạm Duy Tốn were responsible for applying for the open license of school. The purpose of Đông Kinh Nghĩa Thục is "broaden the people's mind without taking money". Its ideas attacked the brutality of the French occupation of Vietnam, but also wanted to learn modernisation from the French. The school required scholars to renounce their elitist traditions and learn from the masses. It also offered the peasants a modern education. The early part of the 20th century saw the growing in status of the Romanized Quốc Ngữ alphabet for the Vietnamese language. Vietnamese patriots realized the potential of Quốc Ngữ as a useful tool to quickly reduce illiteracy and to educate the masses. The traditional Chinese scripts or the Nôm script were seen as too cumbersome and too difficult to learn. The use of prose in literature also became popular with the appearance of many novels; most famous were those from the Tự Lực Văn Đoàn literary circle.

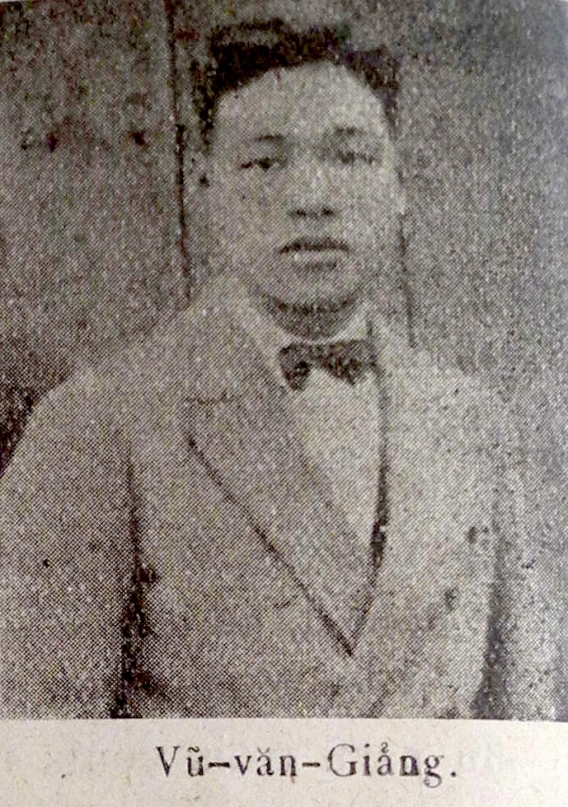
Vũ Hồng Khanh, a Vietnamese non-communist revolutionary and leader of the VNQDĐ, c. 1927

As the French suppressed both movements, and after witnessing revolutionaries in action in China and Russia, Vietnamese revolutionaries began to turn to more radical paths. Phan Bội Châu created the Việt Nam Quang Phục Hội in Guangzhou, planning armed resistance against the French. In 1925, French agents captured him in Shanghai and spirited him to Vietnam. Due to his popularity, Châu was spared from execution and placed under house arrest until his death in 1940. In 1927, the Việt Nam Quốc Dân Đảng (Vietnamese Nationalist Party or VNQDĐ), modeled after the Kuomintang in China, was founded, and the party launched the armed Yên Bái mutiny in 1930 in Tonkin which resulted in its chairman, Nguyễn Thái Học and many other leaders captured and executed by the guillotine.

Marxism was also introduced into Vietnam with the emergence of three separate Communist parties; the Indochinese Communist Party, Annamese Communist Party and the Indochinese Communist Union, joined later by a Trotskyist movement led by Tạ Thu Thâu. In 1930, the Communist International (Comintern) sent Nguyễn Ái Quốc to Hong Kong to coordinate the unification of the parties into the Vietnamese Communist Party (CPV) with Trần Phú as the first Secretary General. Later the party changed its name to the Indochinese Communist Party as the Comintern, under Stalin, did not favor nationalistic sentiments. Being a leftist revolutionary living in France since 1911, Nguyễn Ái Quốc (Ho Chi Minh) participated in founding the French Communist Party and in 1924 traveled to the Soviet Union to join the Comintern. Through the late 1920s, he acted as a Comintern agent to help build Communist movements in Southeast Asia. The communists rebelled with the 1930–31 Nghệ-Tĩnh Soviets and 1940 Cochinchina uprising against the French colonialists, but failed.

=== Second World War and Independence Declaration ===
During World War II, the Japanese army invaded Indochina in September 1940, keeping the Vichy French colonial administration in place as a puppet. In 1941 Ho Chi Minh arrived in northern Vietnam to form the Viet Minh Front. Although it was supposed to be an umbrella group for all elements fighting for Vietnam's independence and democratic republic, it was de facto dominated by the Communist Party. The Viet Minh had a modest armed force and during the war worked with the American Office of Strategic Services (OSS) to collect intelligence on the Japanese.

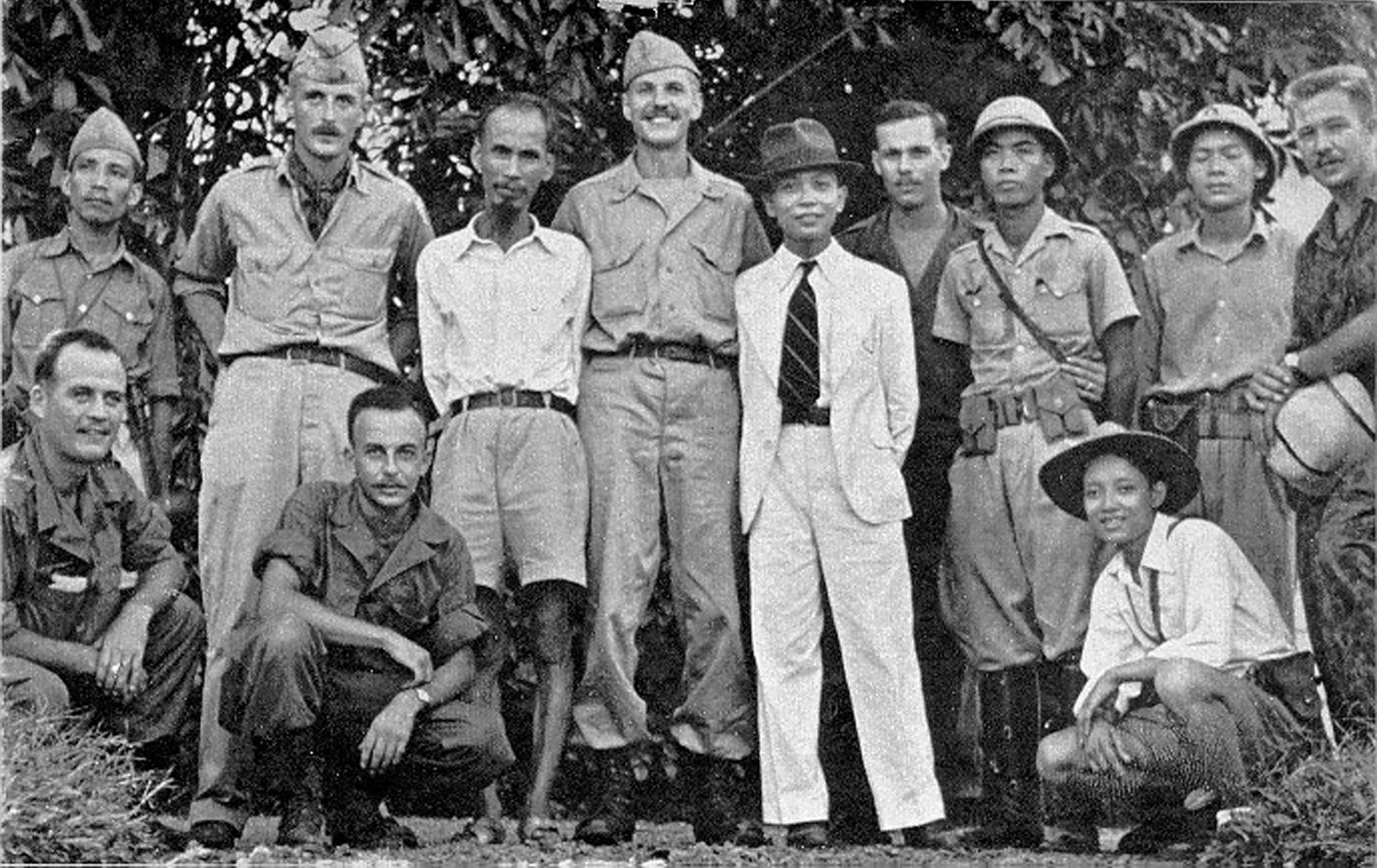
Ho Chi Minh (third from left, standing) and the OSS, 1945

Flag of the Đại Việt Nationalist Party and Việt Nam Nationalist Party

On 9 March 1945, the Japanese removed Vichy France's control of Indochina. Under Japanese military occupation, emperor Bảo Đại declared the short-lived Empire of Vietnam with Trần Trọng Kim as the Prime Minister. A famine broke out in 1944–45, leaving from 600,000 to 2,000,000 dead.

Japan's defeat by the World War II Allies created a power vacuum for Vietnamese nationalists of all parties to seize power in August 1945, forcing Emperor Bảo Đại to abdicate and ending the Nguyễn dynasty on 25 August. On 2 September 1945, Ho Chi Minh of the communist Viet Minh read the Proclamation of Independence of the Democratic Republic of Vietnam (DRV) in Ba Đình flower garden, now known as Ba Đình square, officially creating the Democratic Republic of Vietnam.

== Modern period (1945–present) ==
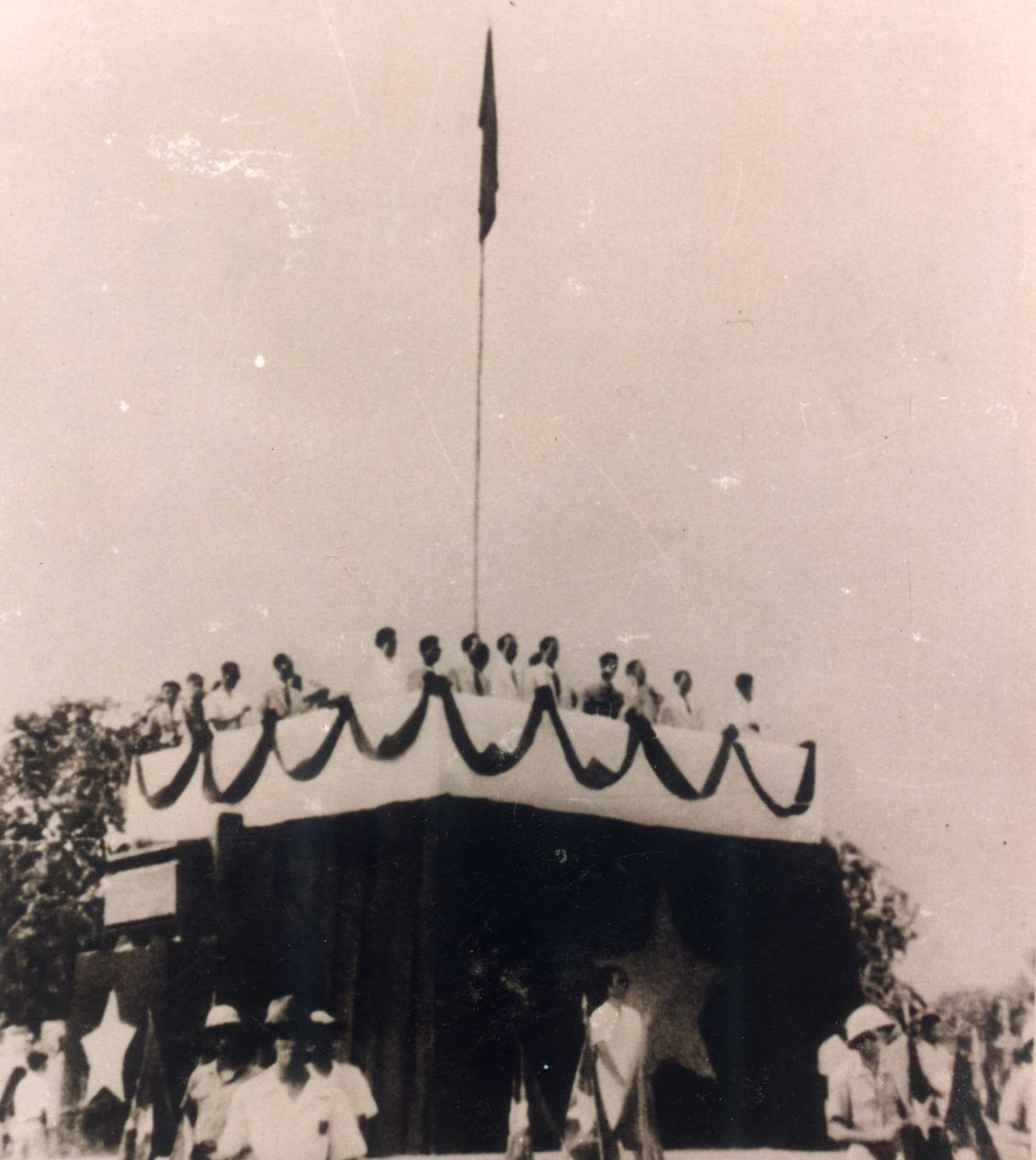
Ho Chi Minh reads the Declaration of Independence and proclaims the Democratic Republic of Vietnam.

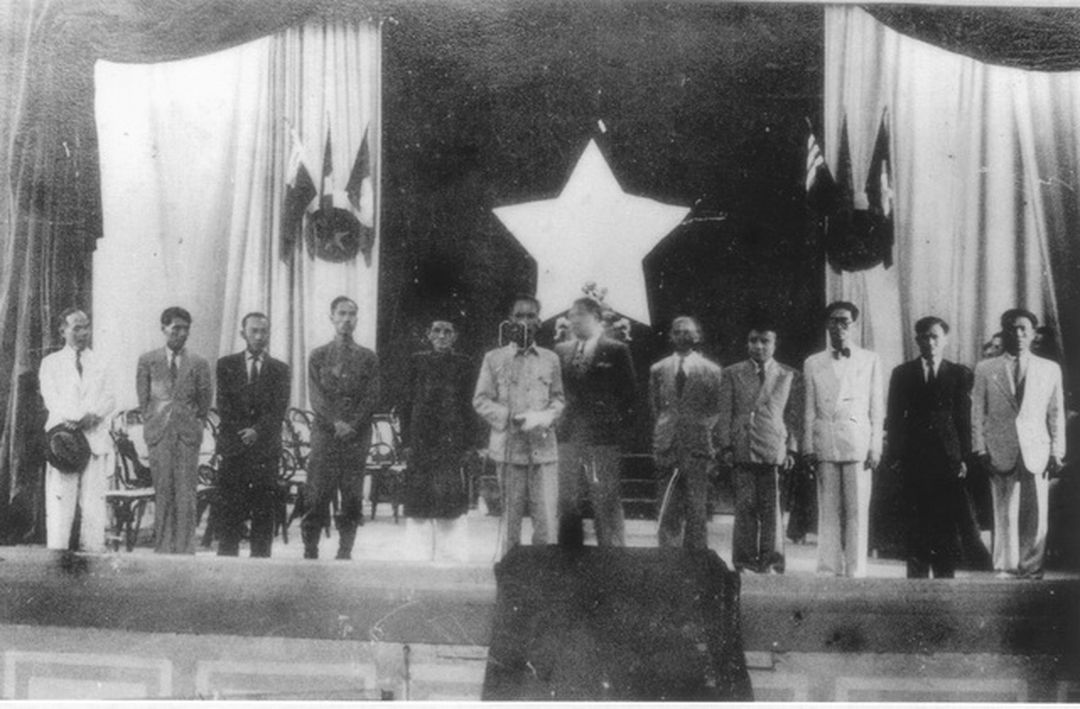
The short-lived coalition government between the Viet Minh and nationalists in early 1946 in North Vietnam.

=== French Indochina War (1945–1954) ===
==== Emergence of opposing sides ====
On 2 September 1945, Ho Chi Minh proclaimed the Democratic Republic of Vietnam (DRV) at Ba Đình Square in Hanoi. On the same day, Japan signed an Instrument of Surrender to the Allies, leading to the official end of World War II. However, Franco-British military forces moved to occupy Vietnam south of the 16th parallel. The French wanted to re-establish control while communist and non-communist Vietnamese forces were locked in internal conflict. The northern half of Vietnam was occupied by the army of the Republic of China led by General Lu Han, but later France received China's consent to advance to the North, which forced the Viet Minh government to make peace with the French and allow their return. The British and Chinese military occupations to disarm the Japanese and allow the French to return to Indochina were recognized by the Allies. Until 1950, no country recognized the Viet Minh led DRV government.

On 6 March 1946, a a preliminary agreement was signed with the Viet Minh to accept that the DRV would become a free state within the French Union while Cochinchina would remain under French rule. The French Union was formally established on 27 October 1946 when France adopted new constitution. The preliminary agreement stipulated that French troops would only stay in Vietnam for five years. The Viet Minh then demanded complete independence and unification of Vietnam within the French Union, but de Gaulle's right-wing faction only accepted Vietnam's nominal autonomy while arguing that the status of Cochinchina would be decided through a referendum. The Viet Minh coexisted with the French, and following the withdrawal of Chinese forces, collaborated with the French to eliminate rival Vietnamese anti-communist nationalists; an estimated 15,000 nationalists were massacred across northern Vietnam in the summer of 1946. Various Vietnamese factions condemned France's creation of an autonomous republic in Cochinchina. The Viet Minh army also refused to come under French authority, resulting in sporadic clashes and the construction of barricades in Hanoi.

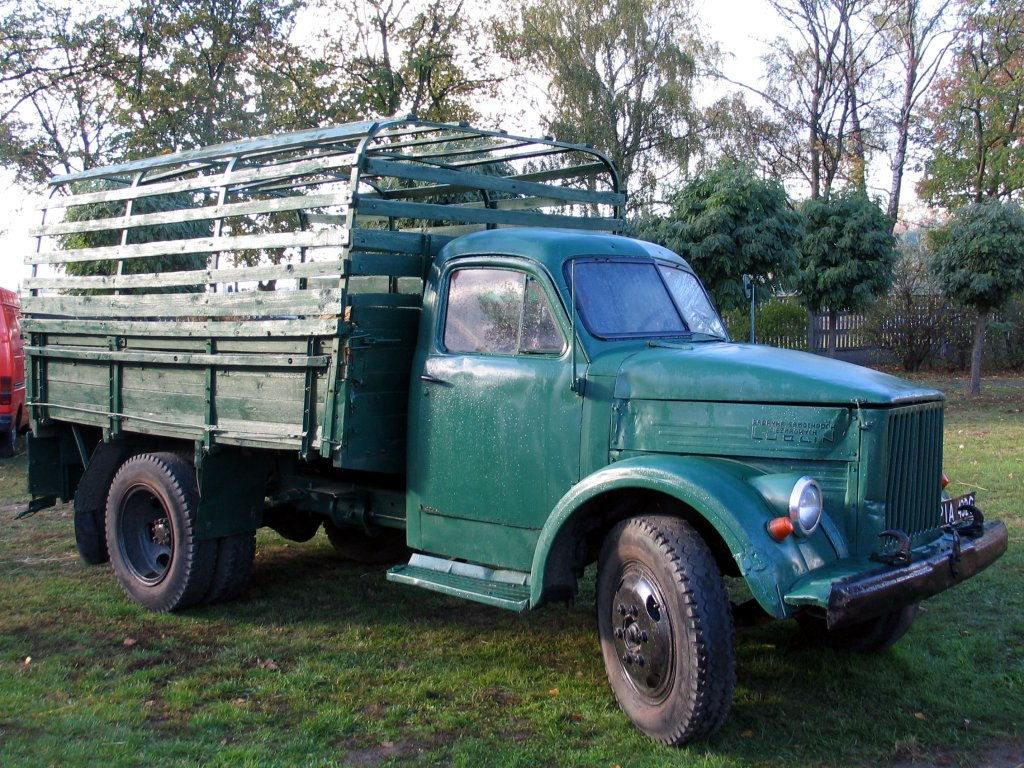
China supplied the communist Viet Minh with many of Soviet-built GAZ-51 trucks during the First Indochina War.

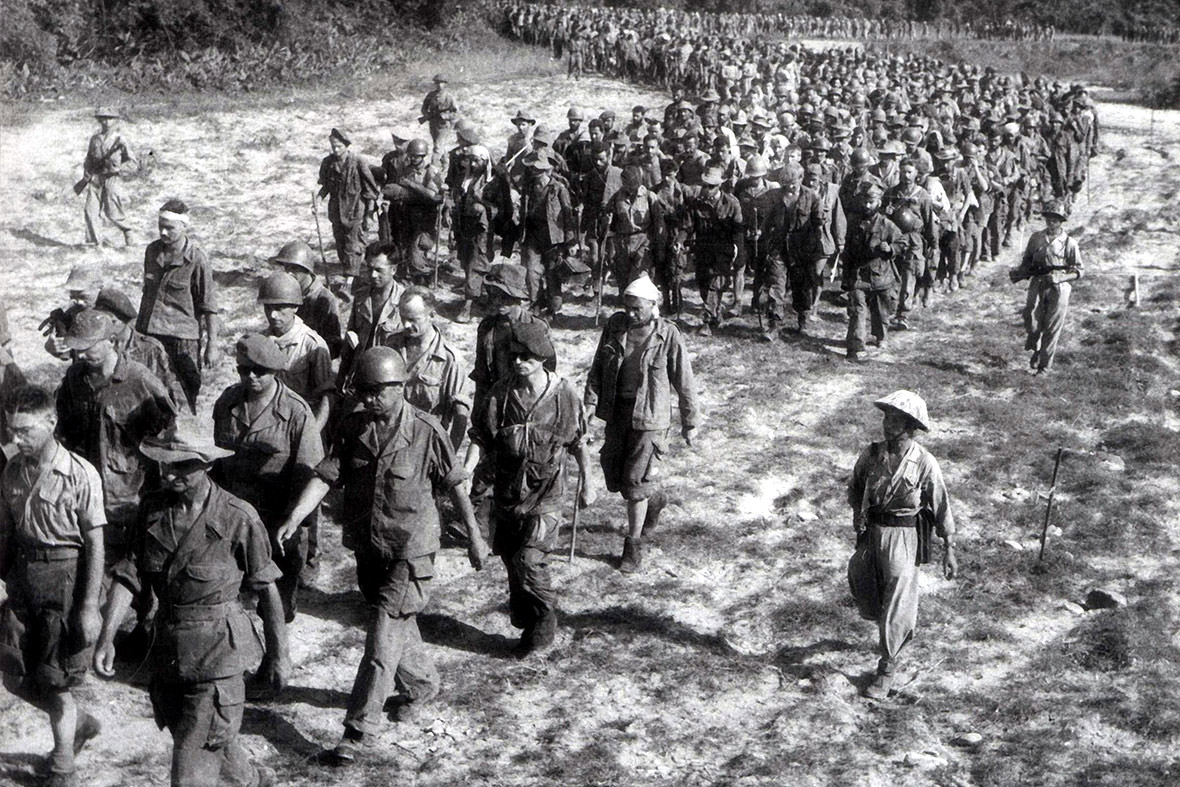
Captured French soldiers from Dien Bien Phu, escorted by Viet Minh troops, walk to a prisoner-of-war camp, 1954

In January 1946, Vietnam had its first National Assembly election. The DRV's first constitution was approved during the Congress session in early November 1946.

==== Total war outbreak ====
In late 1946, after Hồ's return from France, France attacked with a naval bombardment of Haiphong that killed over 6,000 people. The DRV government later attacked French forces in Hanoi, leading to the First Indochina War on 19 December 1946. In Operation Léa in 1947, the French army inflicted severe casualties on the Viet Minh. However it was strategically inconclusive because it failed to capture the Việt Minh leadership or seriously cripple its military forces. In 1947, France wanted to find an anti-communist political alternative to the Viet Minh after the Viet Minh refused to surrender. France decided to bring back the former Vietnamese emperor Bảo Đại. The Vietnamese anti-communist faction formed a political alliance in Nanjing in February 1947, they supported cooperation with France and the Bảo Đại Solution. A Provisional Central Government was formed in May 1948 and later signed a preliminary treaty with France in Hạ Long Bay on 5 June, partly reuniting the protectorates of Annam and Tonkin. After negotiations between the new left-wing French government and Vietnamese anti-communist politicians led by Bảo Đại, France recognized nominal independence of Vietnam within the French Union and gave up their claims to Cochinchina on 8 March 1949, leading the establishment of the State of Vietnam, with its capital located in Saigon. The Accords took effect on 14 June 1949. It ratified by the French National Assembly on 29 January 1950 and signed by French President Vincent Auriol on 2 February, abolishing the Treaty of Huế (1884).

==== Cold War intensification in anticolonial struggles ====
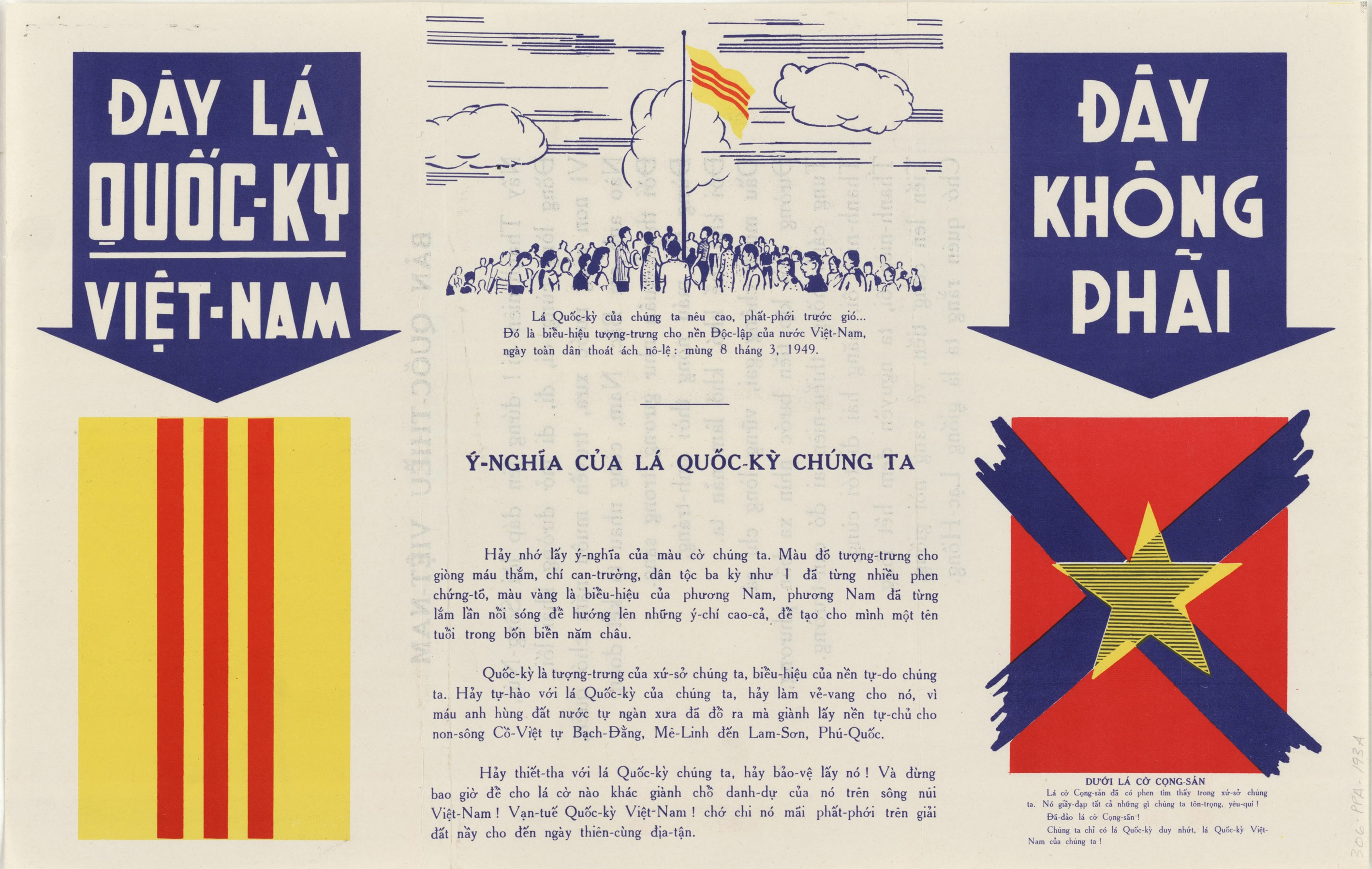
Anti-communist propaganda poster of the State of Vietnam: "This is [our true] national flag of Vietnam", 1951.

The establishment of an anti-communist state in Vietnam made this French colonial war part of the Cold War; the French sought to retake Indochina in the name of anti-communism and help the State of Vietnam. The United States recognized the State of Vietnam on 3 February 1950. and established diplomatic relations on 17 February. On 7 September 1951, the United States signed a treaty with State of Vietnam to provide direct economic aid to Vietnam, however military aid passed through the French until February 1955. France accepted Vietnam's future independence as long as France's interests were guaranteed through the French Union. Vietnam was still de facto ruled by France but more autonomous than before. Vietnam regained Cochinchina after legal procedures in June 1949 and the State of Vietnam was officially proclaimed in July, with Bảo Đại becoming its Head of State (Quốc trưởng). On 8 December 1950, the State of Vietnam was allowed to establish its own army and which fought alongside the French army against the Viet Minh. Since its recognition in 1950, the DRV received support and supplies from communist China and the Soviet Union.

As the French were at a disadvantage during the war, they were forced to accelerate the transfer of power to the State of Vietnam. France was finally persuaded to relinquish its colonies in Indochina in 1954 when Viet Minh forces defeated the French at Dien Bien Phu. On 30 December 1954, the Indochinese Federation was completely dissolved. In December 1955, State of Vietnam withdrew from the French Union.

=== Partition and the Vietnam War (1954–1975) ===
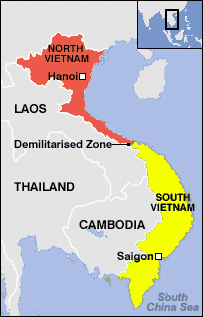
North and South Vietnam (1954–1975)

==== Enduring division ====
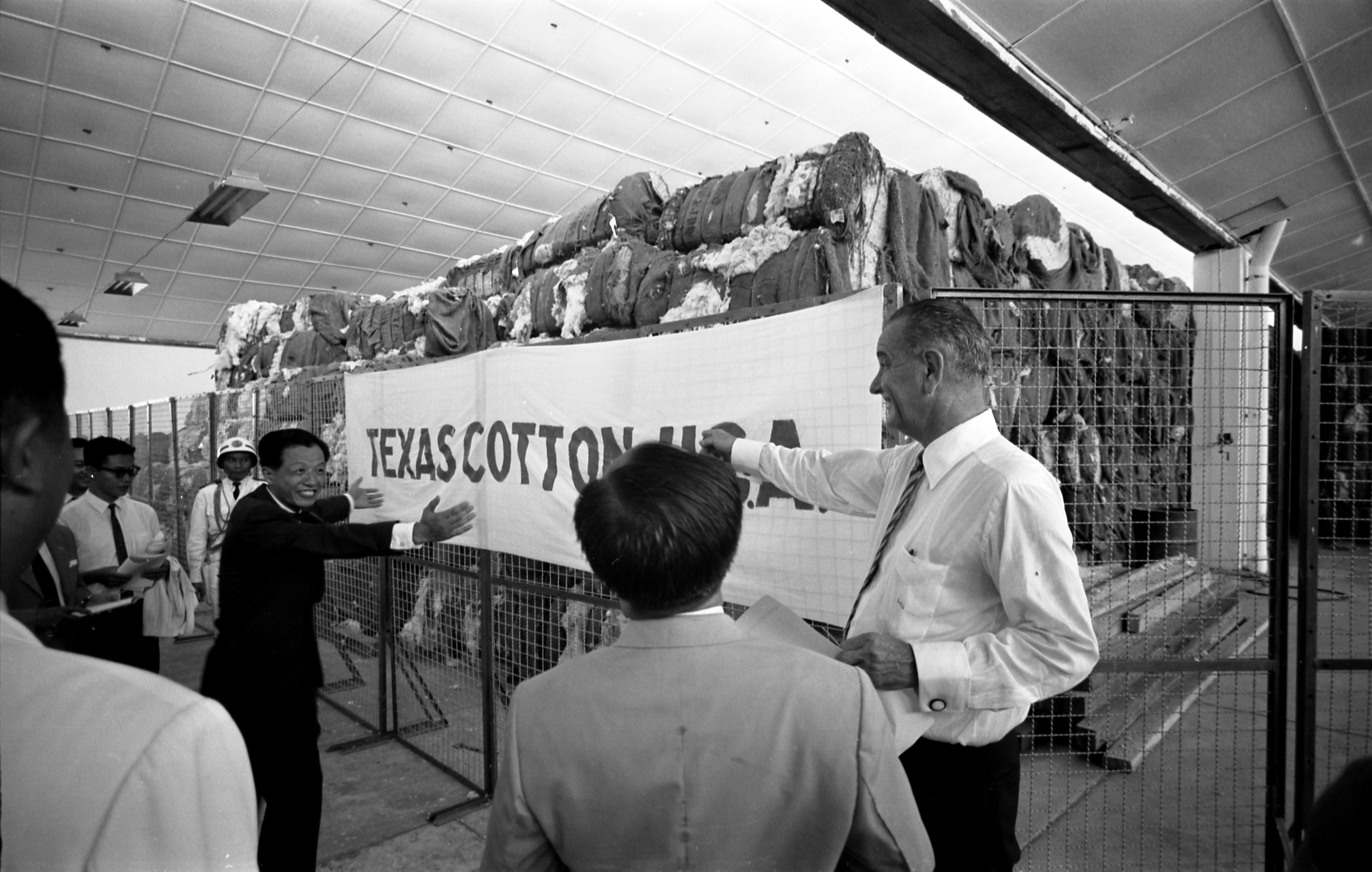
U.S. Vice President Lyndon B. Johnson visiting a textile mill in Saigon, South Vietnam, May 1961

In China, communists (CCP) of Mao established their own state in October 1949 after victory in the civil war. The Soviet Union recognized the Viet Minh government in early 1950. Under Stalin's pressure, the Viet Minh publicly declared itself a communist organization. Despite U.S. assistance from 1950 onward, the French were persuaded to relinquish control of Indochina after the Viet Minh, with the help of China from 1950, defeated them in 1954. China's help improved the Viet Minh's government apparatus and its army. The United States supported Bảo Đại's capitalist and anti-communist Vietnam. On 21 July 1954, an agreement negotiated at Geneva, signed by the communist DRV and France, provisionally divided Vietnam along the 17th Parallel, with Ho Chi Minh's DRV government ruling the North from Hanoi and Bảo Đại's State of Vietnam, governing the South from Saigon. In October 1955, Prime Minister Ngô Đình Diệm overthrew emperor Bảo Đại, and the State of Vietnam became the Republic of Vietnam (South Vietnam) with Diệm as President (Tổng thống) of the capitalist and anti-communist state.

In October 1956, the Republic of Vietnam (RVN) formed its own parliament and created its own constitution. On 28 April 1956, the last French forces left South Vietnam due to pressure from the U.S. and Diệm. According to the 1954 Geneva agreement, a nation-wide election for a united administration was to be held in July 1956. The anti-communist State of Vietnam opposed the division of Vietnam, condemning the French High Command's for handing over the North to the communists and setting a deadline for general elections. The United States merely "took note" of the ceasefire agreements and declared that it would "refrain from the threat or use of force to disturb them. Fearing that young Republic of Vietnam would fall to communism, the United States increased efforts to prevent the spread of international communism from the North and restrain the influence of the Soviet Union. To protect its ally from a potential communist takeover, the U.S. reorganized Military Assistance Advisory Group (MAAG) in Indochina into country-specific units and MAAG Vietnam was established on 1 November 1955. Partition came into force and there was a 300 day relocation period as stipulated by the Geneva accords allowing people to move north or south. Up to one million Northerners moved to South Vietnam while between 14,000 and 45,000 civilians and approximately 100,000 Viet Minh fighters moved North.

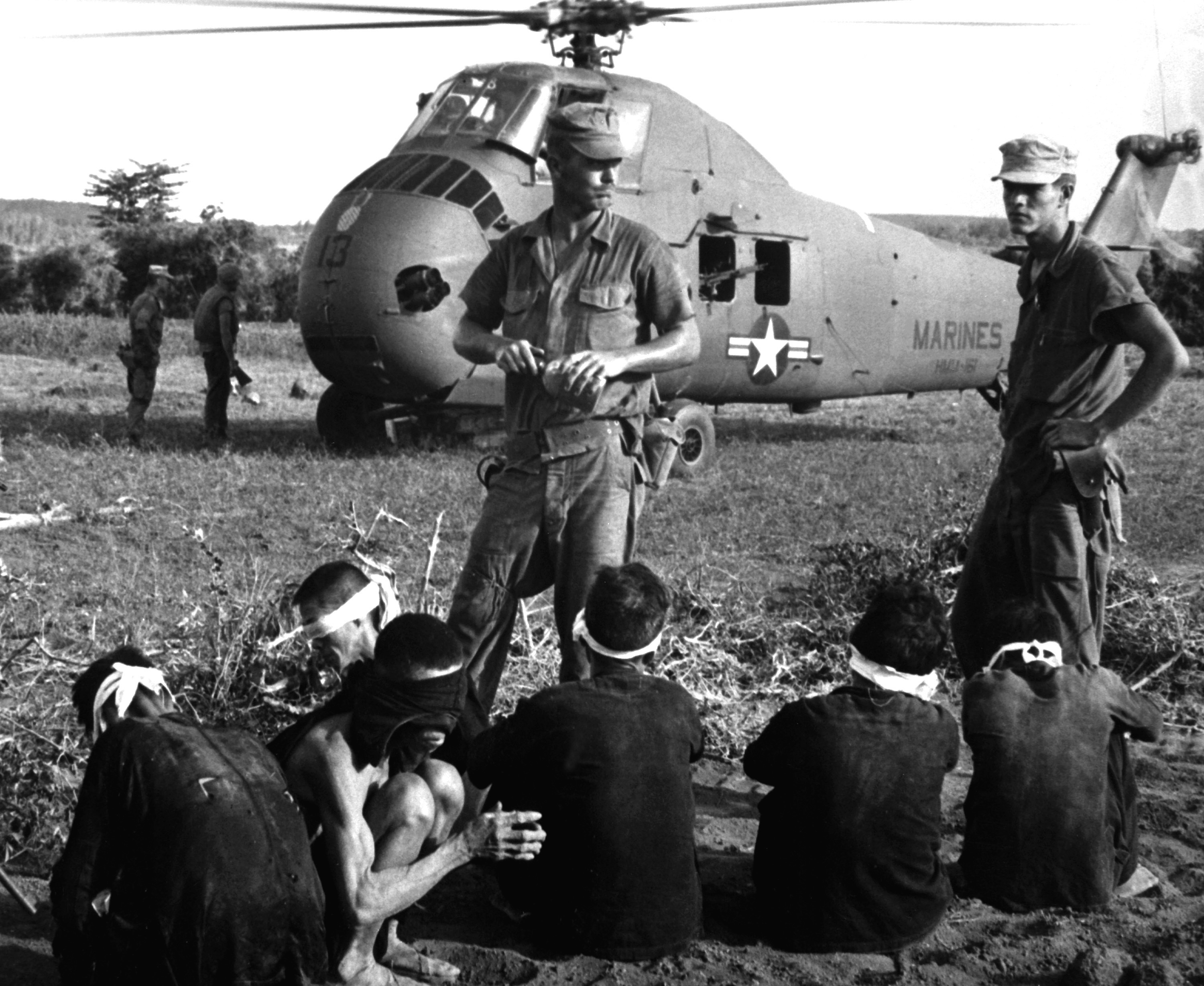
Viet Cong prisoners await being carried by helicopter to rear area after American Operation Starlite. 18–24 August 1965.

Between 1953 and 1956, the DRV government instituted various agrarian reforms, including "rent reduction" and "land reform" that included executions of landlords. Scholar Balasz Szalontai wrote that declassified documents of Hungarian diplomats living in North Vietnam at the time of the land reform estimated a minimum number of 1,337 landlords executed and 23,748 imprisonments during the first and second stages of land reform but gave no estimate for the third stage in early 1956 which likely resulted in more deaths than the previous stages. Scholar Edwin E. Moïse estimated the total number of deaths at around 13,500 including people who committed suicide following arrest

In the South, Diệm went about crushing political and religious opposition, imprisoning or killing of thousands. RVN never signed the 1954 Geneva Accords and refuse to hold general elections to unify with the North, arguing that the North could not guarantee free elections. The U.S. President Eisenhower wrote in 1954: "I have never talked or corresponded with a person knowledgeable in Indochinese affairs who did not agree that had elections been held as of the time of the fighting, possibly 80% of the population would have voted for the Communist Ho Chi Minh…".

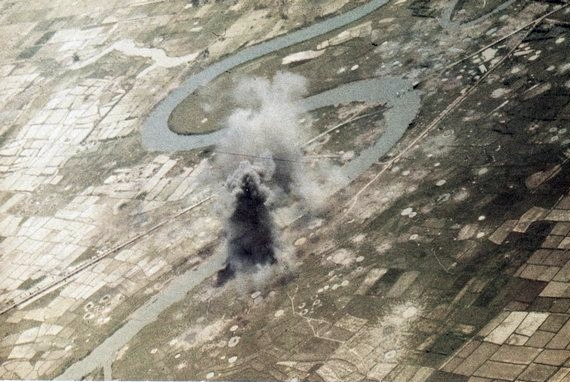
Tens of thousands of civilians were killed during the American bombing of North Vietnam in Operation Rolling Thunder (1965–68).

==== Escalation ====
After failing to convince the South Vietnam to hold general elections, Democratic Republic of Vietnam (DRV) decided to order its guerrilla cadres in the South to launch a war and fight Diệm in 1959.

As a result of the Vietnam War (1955–1975), DRV's People's Army of Vietnam (PAVN) defeated RVN's Army of the Republic of Vietnam (ARVN) culminating in the fall of Saigon and reunification of Vietnam under communist rule. In this Cold War–era conflict both DRV and RVN considered themselves the only legitimate representative of all of Vietnam. The war also spread to Laos and Cambodia. RVN received direct support from foreign militaries, primarily the United States. The U.S. military presence in Vietnam peaked in April 1969, with 543,000 military personnel stationed in the country. DRV also had direct help from foreign countries mainly China and the Soviet Union. RVN always had to deal with the invasion of PAVN forces from the North, while the U.S. and RVN carried out an aerial bombing campaign over North Vietnam in retaliation. After 1972 invasion campaign by the PAVN, an agreement unfavorable to RVN was signed between the U.S. and DRV.

==== The War's final chapter ====
Sporadic fighting continued directly after the agreement was signed before a large invasion of the South by Democratic Republic of Vietnam (DRV). With its advantage, the PAVN continued to fight and sent materiel and troops to the South after the agreement came into effect. The U.S. had pulled out it soldiers in 1973 in accordance with the agreement and subsequently cut aid to Republic of Vietnam (RVN) and no longer wanted to intervene militarily due to the costly and unpopular war while their relations with China improved to isolate the Soviet Union. The global oil crisis of 1973 further aggravated the situation for the RVN. Two years after the withdrawal of the last U.S. forces in March 1973, RVN fell to the PAVN on 30 April 1975. The defeat of RVN marked that beginning of the Vietnamese democracy movement against the communist government. For a year after the defeat, the South was administered by the Republic of South Vietnam, a de facto communist government under the control of DRV, before an official reunification under communism in 1976.

The war left Vietnam devastated, with the total death toll standing at between 966,000 and 3.8 million, with many thousands more permanently disabled by weapons and substances such as Agent Orange. The government of Vietnam states that 4 million people were exposed to Agent Orange, including the children of people who were exposed, and as many as 3 million have suffered illnesses. The Red Cross of Vietnam estimates that up to 1 million people are disabled or have health problems due to contamination from Agent Orange. The United States government has described these figures as unreliable.

=== Post-war, reunification, and centralization (1975–1986) ===
Sino-Vietnamese War, early 1979

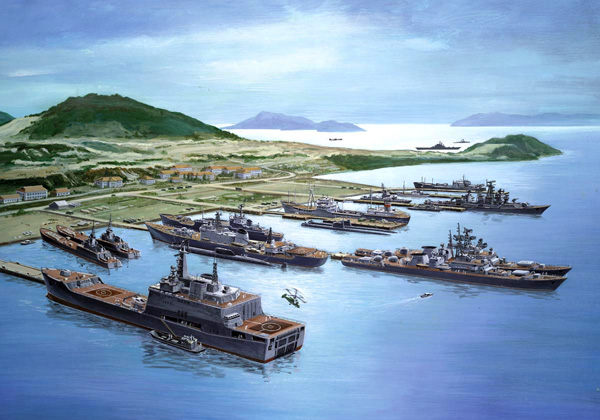
Soviet Cam Ranh Naval Base in Central Vietnam, 1985

On 2 July 1976, North and South Vietnam were officially re-united into a single communist state, known as the Socialist Republic of Vietnam (SRV). The government also renamed Saigon as Ho Chi Minh City in honor of Ho, who died in 1969.

The SRV's increasing closeness with the USSR alarmed the Chinese leadership, which feared "encirclement" by the Soviet Union. The newly unified Vietnam joined the Council for Mutual Economic Assistance (Comecon) on 28 June 1978. Soviet military aid to Vietnam increased from $75–$125 million in 1977 to $600–$800 million in 1978. On 3 November 1978, Vietnam and the Soviet Union signed a formal military alliance. Having unified North and South politically, the CPV still had to integrate the South socially and economically. CPV policy makers were confronted with the South's resistance to communist transformation, as well as traditional animosities arising from cultural and historical differences between the North and South. In the aftermath of the war, under Lê Duẩn's administration, there were no mass executions of South Vietnamese who had collaborated with the U.S. or the South Vietnamese government, confounding Western fears. However, up to 300,000 ARVN officers and soldiers were sent to re-education camps. The New Economic Zones program was implemented by the Vietnamese government. Between 1975 and 1980, more than 1 million northerners migrated to the south and central regions formerly under the Republic of Vietnam. This program, in turn, displaced around 750,000 to over 1 million Southerners from their homes and forcibly relocated them to mountainous forested areas. Many South Vietnamese left the country on their own by boats.

In the late 1970s, Democratic Kampuchea (DK) under the Khmer Rouge regime started harassing and raiding Vietnamese villages across the border. Escalating attacks led to the PAVN invasion of Cambodia in late 1978 who overran the DK capital Phnom Penh, overthrowing the Khmer Rouge regime. In response, China sent troops into Northern Vietnam in 1979 to "punish" Vietnam. Relations between the two countries had been deteriorating. Territorial disagreements along the border and in the South China Sea that had remained dormant during the Vietnam War were revived at the war's end, and a postwar campaign engineered by Hanoi against the ethnic Chinese Hoa community elicited a strong protest from Beijing. China was also opposed to Vietnam's alliance with the Soviet Union following the Sino-Soviet split. During its prolonged military occupation of Cambodia in 1979–89, Vietnam's international isolation extended to relations with the United States. The United States, in addition to citing the SRV minimal cooperation in accounting for Americans who were missing in action (MIAs) as an obstacle to normal relations, opposed normalization as long as Vietnamese troops occupied Cambodia. Washington also continued to enforce the trade embargo imposed on Hanoi at the conclusion of the war in 1975.

Throughout the 1980s, the SRV received nearly $3 billion a year in economic and military aid from the Soviet Union and conducted most of its trade with the USSR and other Comecon countries. In December 1986, Nguyễn Văn Linh, who became CPV general secretary the following year, launched a campaign for political and economic renewal (Đổi Mới). His policies were characterized by political and economic experimentation that was similar to simultaneous reform agenda undertaken in the Soviet Union. Reflecting the spirit of political compromise, Vietnam phased out its re-education effort. The government stopped promoting agricultural and industrial cooperatives. Farmers were permitted to till private plots alongside state-owned land, and in 1990 the communist government passed a law encouraging the establishment of private businesses. Bogged down in Cambodia and unable to defeat the remnants of the Khmer Rouge, Vietnam withdrew its troops in 1989.

=== Đổi Mới and contemporary era (1986–present) ===
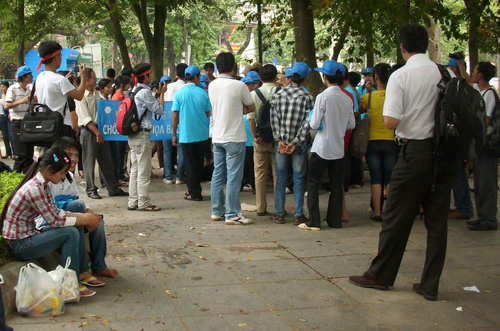
A civic action of the Vietnamese democracy movement in Hanoi, 2010

Both Vietnam and China planned the normalization of their relations in a secret summit in Chengdu in September 1990, and officially normalized ties on 5 November 1991, before the fall of the Soviet Union the following month. In February 1994, the United States lifted its economic embargo against Vietnam, and in June 1995, the United States and Vietnam normalized relations. After American President Bill Clinton visited Vietnam in November 2000, a new era in relations between the two countries began. No other U.S. leader had ever officially visited Hanoi and Clinton was the first to visit Vietnam since the end of the war. Vietnam became an increasingly attractive destination for economic development. Over time, Vietnam has played an increasingly significant role on the world stage. Its economic reforms significantly changed Vietnamese society and increased Vietnamese relevance in both Asian and broader international affairs. Also, due to Vietnam's strategic geopolitical position near the intersection of the Pacific and Indian oceans, many world powers began to take on a much more favorable stance towards Vietnam.

On 11 January 2007, Vietnam became the 150th member of the WTO (World Trade Organization). According to the World Bank, Vietnam became a development success story. Its economic reforms since the beginning of Đổi Mới in late 1986 helped to change Vietnam from being one of the world's poorest nations to a middle-income economy in one generation.

However, Vietnam also has territorial disputes, mostly with Cambodia over their shared border, and especially with China, over the South China Sea. In 2016, President Barack Obama became the 3rd U.S. Head of State to visit Vietnam. His historic visit helped to normalize relations with Vietnam. This improvement of U.S.-Vietnam relations was further increased by the lifting of a lethal arms embargo, allowing the Vietnamese government to buy lethal weapons and modernize its military.

On 27–28 February 2019, the 2019 North Korea–United States Hanoi Summit was held between North Korean supreme leader Kim Jong Un and U.S. president Donald Trump in Hanoi, Vietnam.

Vietnam became a newly industrialized country, and a regional power. Vietnam was named as one of the Next Eleven nations, a term describing eleven economies which could have BRIC-like potential to rival G7 nations.

In 2021, General Secretary of the Communist Party, Nguyen Phu Trong, was re-elected for his third term in office, meaning he was Vietnam's most powerful leader in decades.

In 2023, a three-person collective leadership was responsible for governing Vietnam. President Vo Van Thuong (since 2023), Prime Minister Pham Minh Chinh (since 2021) and the most powerful leader Nguyễn Phú Trọng (since 2011) as the Communist Party of Vietnam's General Secretary.

During a visit to Vietnam on 10 September 2023, U.S. President Joe Biden met General Secretary Nguyễn Phú Trọng. Following this, the Vietnamese government recognized the relationship between the United States and Vietnam as a "Comprehensive Strategic Partnership", emphasizing the increasing importance of bilateral links between the two countries.

In July 2024, General Secretary Nguyễn Phú Trọng died and was succeeded by Tô Lâm. In January 2026, Tô Lâm was re-elected as general secretary of the Vietnam's Communist Party for the next five years by the party congress.

== See also ==
- Communism in Vietnam
- Economic history of Vietnam
- French Indochina – 1887–1954 French territories in Southeast Asia
- History of Asia
- History of Southeast Asia
- Lịch sử nước An Nam (text)
- List of Vietnamese dynasties
- North Vietnam – Country in Southeast Asia (1945–1976)
- Politics of Vietnam
- South Vietnam – Country in Southeast Asia (1955–1975)
- Việt Nam sử lược (book) – Vietnamese history text (published 1920)
- Vietnam under Chinese rule – Four historical periods when Vietnam was ruled by Chinese dynasties
- Vietnamese nationalism – Form of nationalism regarding the Vietnamese people and nation

== Citations ==
=== Bibliography ===
- Boylan, Kevin; Olivier, Luc (2018). Valley of the Shadow: The Siege of Dien Bien Phu. Oxford: Osprey Press. ISBN 978-1-4728-2437-0.
- Choi, Byung Wook (2004). Southern Vietnam Under the Reign of Minh Mạng (1820–1841): Central Policies and Local Response. SEAP Publications. ISBN 978-0-87727-138-3.
- Druk. C.K. Uniwersytetu Jagiellońskiego (1884). Przegla̜d polski: Volume 18, Issues 7-9.
- Vietnamese National Bureau for Historical Record (1998). Khâm định Việt sử Thông giám cương mục (in Vietnamese). Hanoi: Education Publishing House.
- Ngô Sĩ, Liên (2009). Đại Việt sử ký toàn thư (in Vietnamese) (Nội các quan bản ed.). Hanoi: Cultural Publishing House. ISBN 978-604-1-69013-4.
- Trần Trọng, Kim (1971). Việt Nam sử lược (in Vietnamese). Saigon: Center for School Materials.
- Coedes, George (1975). Vella, Walter F. (ed.). The Indianized States of Southeast Asia. University of Hawaii Press. ISBN 978-0-8248-0368-1.
- Dutton, George (2006). The Tây Sơn Uprising: Society and Rebellion in Eighteenth-century Vietnam. University of Hawaiʻi Press. ISBN 978-0-8248-2984-1.
- Keith, Charles (2012). Catholic Vietnam: A Church from Empire to Nation. University of California Press. ISBN 978-0-520-27247-7.
- Maspero, Georges (2002). The Champa Kingdom. White Lotus Co., Ltd. ISBN 978-974-7534-99-3.
- Patti, Archimedes L.A. (2008). Why Vietnam. Nhà xuất bản Đà Nẵng.
- Phạm Văn, Sơn (1960). Việt Sử Toàn Thư (in Vietnamese). Saigon.
- Riley, Jonathon (2014). Decisive Battles: From Yorktown to Operation Desert Storm. Bloomsbury Publishing. ISBN 978-1-4411-2674-0.
- Stern, Lewis (1987). "The Vietnamese Communist Party in 1986: Party Reform Initiatives, the Scramble towards Economic Revitalization, and the Road to the Sixth National Congress". Southeast Asian Affairs. 14 (1) SEAA87t. Institute of Southeast Asian Studies: 345–363. doi:10.1355/SEAA87T. JSTOR 27908584.
- Taylor, K. W. (1983). The Birth of Vietnam. University of California Press. ISBN 978-0-520-07417-0.
- Taylor, K. W. (2013). A History of the Vietnamese. Cambridge University Press. ISBN 978-1-139-02121-0.
- Walker, Hugh Dyson (2012). East Asia: A New History. AuthorHouse. ISBN 978-1-4772-6516-1.
- Juzheng, Xue (1995) [974]. Old History of the Five Dynasties. Zhonghua Book Company. ISBN 7-101-00321-4.
- Twitchett, Denis (2008). The Cambridge History of China 1. Cambridge University Press.
