= Glottal consonant =

Place of articulation

Glottal consonants are consonants using the glottis as their primary articulation. Many phoneticians consider them, or at least the glottal fricative, to be transitional states of the glottis without a point of articulation as other consonants have, while some do not consider them to be consonants at all. However, glottal consonants behave as typical consonants in many languages. For example, in Literary Arabic, most words are formed from a root C-C-C consisting of three consonants, which are inserted into templates such as /CaːCiC/ or /maCCuːC/. The glottal consonants /h/ and /ʔ/ can occupy any of the three root consonant slots, just like "normal" consonants such as /k/ or /n/.

The glottal consonants in the International Phonetic Alphabet are as follows:

IPA	Description	Example			
IPA	Description	Language	Orthography	IPA	Meaning
ʔ	glottal stop	Hawaiian	Hawaiʻi	[həˈvɐjʔi, həˈwɐjʔi]	Hawaii
ʔ͜h	voiceless glottal affricate	Yuxi dialect	可	[ʔ͜ho˥˧]	'can, may'
h	voiceless glottal fricative	English	hat	[ˈhæt]	hat
ɦ	voiced glottal fricative	Czech	Praha	[ˈpraɦa]	Prague
˷	creaky-voiced glottal approximant	Gimi	hagok	[ha˷oʔ]	'many'

== Characteristics ==
In many languages, the "fricatives" are not true fricatives. This is a historical usage of the word. They instead represent transitional states of the glottis (phonation) without a specific place of articulation, and may behave as approximants. [h] is a voiceless transition. [ɦ] is a breathy-voiced transition, and could be transcribed as [h̤].

The glottal stop occurs in many languages. Often all vocalic onsets are preceded by a glottal stop, for example in German (in careful pronunciation; often omitted in practice). The Hawaiian language writes the glottal stop as the ‘okina ⟨‘⟩, which resembles a single open quotation mark. Some alphabets use diacritics for the glottal stop, such as hamza ⟨ء⟩ in the Arabic alphabet; in many languages of Mesoamerica, the Latin letter ⟨h⟩ is used for glottal stop, in Maltese, the letter ⟨q⟩ is used, and in many indigenous languages of the Caucasus, the letter commonly referred to as heng ⟨Ꜧ ꜧ⟩ is used.

Because the glottis is necessarily closed for the glottal stop, it cannot be voiced. So-called voiced glottal stops are not full stops, but rather creaky-voiced glottal approximants (here transcribed with the extIPA symbol for pre-/post-creak ⟨˷⟩). They occur as the intervocalic allophone of glottal stop in many languages. Gimi contrasts /ʔ/ and /˷/, corresponding to /k/ and /ɡ/ in related languages.

== See also ==
- Glottalic consonant
- Glottalization
- Place of articulation
- Index of phonetics articles
- Guttural

Place →	Labial					Coronal										Dorsal					Laryngeal			
Manner ↓	Bilabial		Labiodental		Linguolabial		Dental		Alveolar		Postalveolar		Retroflex		(Alveolo-)palatal		Velar		Uvular		Pharyngeal/epiglottal		Glottal	
Nasal	m̥	m	ɱ̊	ɱ		n̼	n̪̊	n̪	n̥	n	n̠̊	n̠	ɳ̊	ɳ	ɲ̊	ɲ	ŋ̊	ŋ	ɴ̥	ɴ				
Plosive	p	b	p̪	b̪	t̼	d̼	t̪	d̪	t	d			ʈ	ɖ	c	ɟ	k	ɡ	q	ɢ	ʡ		ʔ	
Sibilant affricate							t̪s̪	d̪z̪	ts	dz	t̠ʃ	d̠ʒ	tʂ	dʐ	tɕ	dʑ								
Non-sibilant affricate	pɸ	bβ	p̪f	b̪v			t̪θ	d̪ð	tɹ̝̊	dɹ̝	t̠ɹ̠̊˔	d̠ɹ̠˔			cç	ɟʝ	kx	ɡɣ	qχ	ɢʁ	ʡʜ	ʡʢ	ʔh	
Sibilant fricative							s̪	z̪	s	z	ʃ	ʒ	ʂ	ʐ	ɕ	ʑ								
Non-sibilant fricative	ɸ	β	f	v	θ̼	ð̼	θ	ð	θ̠	ð̠	ɹ̠̊˔	ɹ̠˔	ɻ̊˔	ɻ˔	ç	ʝ	x	ɣ	χ	ʁ	ħ	ʕ	h	ɦ
Approximant		β̞		ʋ				ð̞		ɹ		ɹ̠		ɻ		j		ɰ						˷
Tap/flap		ⱱ̟		ⱱ					ɾ̥	ɾ			ɽ̊	ɽ						ɢ̆		ʡ̆		
Trill	ʙ̥	ʙ							r̥	r		r̠	ɽ̊r̥	ɽr					ʀ̥	ʀ	ʜ	ʢ		
Lateral affricate									tɬ	dɮ			tꞎ	d𝼅	c𝼆	ɟʎ̝	k𝼄	ɡʟ̝						
Lateral fricative							ɬ̪		ɬ	ɮ			ꞎ	𝼅	𝼆	ʎ̝	𝼄	ʟ̝						
Lateral approximant								l̪	l̥	l		l̠	ɭ̊	ɭ	ʎ̥	ʎ	ʟ̥	ʟ		ʟ̠				
Lateral tap/flap									ɺ̥	ɺ			𝼈̊	𝼈		ʎ̆		ʟ̆						

		BL	LD	D	A	PA	RF	P	V	U
Implosive	Voiced	ɓ			ɗ		ᶑ	ʄ	ɠ	ʛ
Implosive	Voiceless	ɓ̥			ɗ̥		ᶑ̊	ʄ̊	ɠ̊	ʛ̥
Ejective	Stop	pʼ			tʼ		ʈʼ	cʼ	kʼ	qʼ
Ejective	Affricate		p̪fʼ	tθʼ	tsʼ	tʃʼ	tʂʼ	tɕʼ	kxʼ	qχʼ
Ejective	Fricative	ɸʼ	fʼ	θʼ	sʼ	ʃʼ	ʂʼ	ɕʼ	xʼ	χʼ
Ejective	Lateral affricate				tɬʼ			c𝼆ʼ	k𝼄ʼ	q𝼄ʼ
Ejective	Lateral fricative				ɬʼ					
Click (top: velar; bottom: uvular)	Tenuis	kʘ qʘ		kǀ qǀ	kǃ qǃ		k𝼊 q𝼊	kǂ qǂ		
Click (top: velar; bottom: uvular)	Voiced	ɡʘ ɢʘ		ɡǀ ɢǀ	ɡǃ ɢǃ		ɡ𝼊 ɢ𝼊	ɡǂ ɢǂ		
Click (top: velar; bottom: uvular)	Nasal	ŋʘ ɴʘ		ŋǀ ɴǀ	ŋǃ ɴǃ		ŋ𝼊 ɴ𝼊	ŋǂ ɴǂ	ʞ	
Click (top: velar; bottom: uvular)	Tenuis lateral				kǁ qǁ					
Click (top: velar; bottom: uvular)	Voiced lateral				ɡǁ ɢǁ					
Click (top: velar; bottom: uvular)	Nasal lateral				ŋǁ ɴǁ					
