= Yuxi dialect =

Mandarin dialect in Yunnan province

- 玉溪话
- Native to: China
- Region: Yuxi, Yunnan
- Language family: Sino-Tibetan: Sinitic; Mandarin; Southwestern Mandarin; Yuxi dialect

Language codes
- ISO 639-3: –

The Yuxi dialect (simplified Chinese: 玉溪话; traditional Chinese: 玉溪話; pinyin: Yùxīhuà) is a dialect of Southwestern Mandarin spoken in the prefecture-level city of Yuxi, Yunnan province.

== Phonology ==
=== Initials ===
In the Yuxi dialect, there are 24 initials including the zero initial /∅/.

		Labial	Dental	Alveolar	Post- alveolar	Alveolo- palatal	Glottal
Nasal		m		n			
Plosive/ Affricate	tenuis	p	t̪s̪	t	tʃ	tɕ	ʔ
Plosive/ Affricate	aspirated	pʰ	t̪s̪ʰ	tʰ	tʃʰ	tɕʰ	ʔh
Continuant	voiceless	f	s̪		ʃ	ɕ	h
Continuant	voiced	v	z̪	l	ʒ		

=== Finals ===
The Yuxi dialect has 8 monophthongs. Qualities in parentheses appear only in diphthongs and triphthongs.

	Front	Central		Back
Apical		ɿ	ʅ	
Close	i			u
Near-close	(ɪ)			
Close-mid	(e)			o
Mid	(e̞)	ə	ɚ	
Open-mid	(ɛ)			(ɔ)
Open		a		(ɑ)

ɿ	ʅ	a	o	ə	ɚ	ae	e̞ɪ	ɑɔ	əu	an	ən	aŋ	oŋ
i	iɔ	ia	io	iɛ	iu			iɑɔ	iəu	iɛn	ĩn	iaŋ	ioŋ
u		ua				uae	ue̞ɪ			uan			

== Bibliography ==
- Yao, Yuanfei (June 2020). "The Study of the Effects of Yunnan Yuxi Dialect on Received Pronunciation". Theory and Practice in Language Studies. 10 (6): 664–671. doi:10.17507/tpls.1006.06.
