= Glottal approximant =

The phonetics term glottal approximant refers to some speech sounds, including the following:

- Breathy-voiced glottal approximant
- Creaky-voiced glottal approximant
- Voiceless glottal approximant
