= Khmer Braille =

Braille system for the Khmer language

Khmer Braille Cambodian Braille
- Script type: Alphabet
- Print basis: Khmer alphabet
- Languages: Khmer

Related scripts
- Parent systems: Braille: Khmer Braille

Khmer Braille is the braille alphabet of the Khmer language of Cambodia.

== Charts ==
In printed Khmer, the alphabet is divided into consonant letters, consonant diacritics (conjuncts), and vowel diacritics. (That is, the Khmer alphabet is an abugida.) In braille Khmer, however, all of these are full letters. Out of deference to tradition, however, the braille alphabet is divided into sections according to the form in print.

=== Print letters ===
The first three rows are the stand-alone consonants in print, and the last two the stand-alone vowels. These occur initially and after a/another vowel.

Braille	⠛ (braille pattern dots-1245)	⠅ (braille pattern dots-13)	⠠ (braille pattern dots-6) ⠛ (braille pattern dots-1245)	⠠ (braille pattern dots-6) ⠅ (braille pattern dots-13)	⠻ (braille pattern dots-12456)	⠚ (braille pattern dots-245)	⠬ (braille pattern dots-346)	⠠ (braille pattern dots-6) ⠚ (braille pattern dots-245)	⠠ (braille pattern dots-6) ⠬ (braille pattern dots-346)	⠠ (braille pattern dots-6) ⠹ (braille pattern dots-1456)
Print	ក kâ k	ខ khâ kh	គ kô k	ឃ khô kh	ង ngô ng	ច châ ch	ឆ chhâ chh	ជ chô ch	ឈ chhô chh	ញ nhô nh
Braille	⠙ (braille pattern dots-145)	⠤ (braille pattern dots-36) ⠾ (braille pattern dots-23456)	⠠ (braille pattern dots-6) ⠙ (braille pattern dots-145)	⠴ (braille pattern dots-356) ⠾ (braille pattern dots-23456)	⠝ (braille pattern dots-1345)	⠞ (braille pattern dots-2345)	⠾ (braille pattern dots-23456)	⠠ (braille pattern dots-6) ⠞ (braille pattern dots-2345)	⠠ (braille pattern dots-6) ⠾ (braille pattern dots-23456)	⠠ (braille pattern dots-6) ⠝ (braille pattern dots-1345)
Print	ដ dâ d	ឋ thâ th	ឌ dô d	ឍ thô th	ណ nâ n	ត tâ t	ថ thâ th	ទ tô t	ធ thô th	ន nô n
Braille	⠃ (braille pattern dots-12)	⠏ (braille pattern dots-1234)	⠯ (braille pattern dots-12346)	⠠ (braille pattern dots-6) ⠏ (braille pattern dots-1234)	⠍ (braille pattern dots-134)		⠠ (braille pattern dots-6) ⠽ (braille pattern dots-13456)	⠗ (braille pattern dots-1235)	⠠ (braille pattern dots-6) ⠇ (braille pattern dots-123)	⠺ (braille pattern dots-2456)
Print	ប bâ b	ផ phâ ph	ព pô p	ភ phô ph	ម mô m		យ yô y	រ rô r	ល lô l	វ vô v
Braille			⠎ (braille pattern dots-234)	⠓ (braille pattern dots-125)					⠇ (braille pattern dots-123)	⠕ (braille pattern dots-135)
Print	ឝ shô sh	ឞ ssâ ss	ស sâ s	ហ hâ h					ឡ lâ l	អ 'â '
Braille	⠠ (braille pattern dots-6) ⠌ (braille pattern dots-34)	⠑ (braille pattern dots-15) ⠁ (braille pattern dots-1)	⠉ (braille pattern dots-14) ⠁ (braille pattern dots-1)		⠀ (braille pattern blank)	⠳ (braille pattern dots-1256)	⠸ (braille pattern dots-456) ⠉ (braille pattern dots-14)			
Print	ឥ ĕ	ឦ ei	ឧ ŏ, ŭ	ឨ –	ឩ u	ឪ ŏu	ឳ âu			
Braille	⠠ (braille pattern dots-6) ⠭ (braille pattern dots-1346)	⠭ (braille pattern dots-1346) ⠁ (braille pattern dots-1)	⠹ (braille pattern dots-1456)	⠹ (braille pattern dots-1456) ⠁ (braille pattern dots-1)	⠐ (braille pattern dots-5)	⠋ (braille pattern dots-124) ⠁ (braille pattern dots-1)	⠱ (braille pattern dots-156) ⠁ (braille pattern dots-1)			
Print	ឫ rœ̆	ឬ rœ	ឭ lœ̆	ឮ lœ	ឯ ê	ឰ ai	ឱ/ឲ aô			

As in print, the consonant letters fall into two classes which trigger different readings of associated vowels. When no vowel is written, an â or ô (depending on the consonant class) is understood. In print these two classes are simply different consonants. In braille, however, they are written the same, except that the ô class is marked by prefixing point-6. Thus ខ khâ is ⠅, while ឃ khô (an unrelated letter in print) is ⠠⠅. The exceptions are four ô-class consonants which do not have â-class partners, ⠻⠍⠗⠺ ngô, mô, rô, vô.

Most of the stand-alone vowels are derived from the combining vowels (next section) by a prefix or suffix.

Shaded cells either have not been assigned braille codes, or are derived with combinations of diacritics not included in UNESCO (2013).

Conjuncts (combinations of full and subscript consonants) in print are indicated with a linking ⠧ in braille. Thus the print ខ្ម khm of "Khmer" is ⠅⠧⠍ in braille.

=== Print diacritics ===
Vowels are diacritics in print, but in braille they are full letters and follow what is the host letter in print. Thus in print ខ្មែរ khmêr, the vowel ែ ê precedes the consonant cluster ខ្ម khm, but in braille the vowel ⠣ ê follows the consonant cluster ⠅⠧⠍ khm, thus: ⠅⠧⠍⠣⠗ khmêr. The vowels are as follows. (In order to display properly on all browsers, the print diacritics are hosted on the letter អ, which is not repeated in braille. On that host, the vowels take the upper romanized value; on a class-ô consonant they would have the lower value.)

Braille	⠡ (braille pattern dots-16)	⠌ (braille pattern dots-34)	⠑ (braille pattern dots-15)	⠪ (braille pattern dots-246)	⠢ (braille pattern dots-26)	⠉ (braille pattern dots-14)	⠒ (braille pattern dots-25)	⠆ (braille pattern dots-23)
Print (on អ)	អា a éa	អិ ĕ ĭ	អី ei i	អឹ œ̆	អឺ œ	អុ ŏ ŭ	អូ o u	អួ uŏ
Braille	⠩ (braille pattern dots-146)	⠟ (braille pattern dots-12345)	⠷ (braille pattern dots-12356)	⠋ (braille pattern dots-124)	⠣ (braille pattern dots-126)	⠊ (braille pattern dots-24)	⠱ (braille pattern dots-156)	⠸ (braille pattern dots-456)
Print	អើ aeu eu	អឿ œă	អៀ iĕ	អេ é	អែ ê	អៃ ai ey	អោ aô oŭ	អៅ au ŏu
Braille	⠫ (braille pattern dots-1246)	⠽ (braille pattern dots-13456)	⠵ (braille pattern dots-1356)	⠁ (braille pattern dots-1)	⠭ (braille pattern dots-1346)	⠥ (braille pattern dots-136)	⠮ (braille pattern dots-2346)	
Print	អុំ om ŭm	អំ âm um	អាំ ăm ŏâm	អះ ăh eăh	អុះ ŏh uh	អេះ éh	អោះ aŏh uŏh	

A final h is added to several additional vowels tacking ⠁ អះ on to one of the braille letters above: អិះ ⠌⠁ ĕh / ĭh, អឹះ ⠪⠁ œ̆h, អែះ ⠣⠁ êh.

Print Khmer has several other diacritics which are not listed in UNESCO (2013) for Braille.

=== Punctuation ===
Cambodian Braille punctuation is modified from Western braille. The traditional full stop, ។, is braille ⠿.

⠂ (braille pattern dots-2)	⠲ (braille pattern dots-256)	⠿ (braille pattern dots-123456)	⠆ (braille pattern dots-23)	⠘ (braille pattern dots-45)	⠖ (braille pattern dots-235)	...	...
,	.	។	? ;	:	!	“ ... ”	( ... )

The same character ⠆ is used for the semicolon and the question mark. The colon also differs from international norms.
