= Khmer Symbols =

- Range: U+19E0..U+19FF (32 code points)
- Plane: BMP
- Scripts: Khmer
- Symbol sets: Lunar date symbols
- Assigned: 32 code points
- Unused: 0 reserved code points

Unicode version history
- 4.0 (2003): 32 (+32)

Unicode documentation
- Code chart ∣ Web page

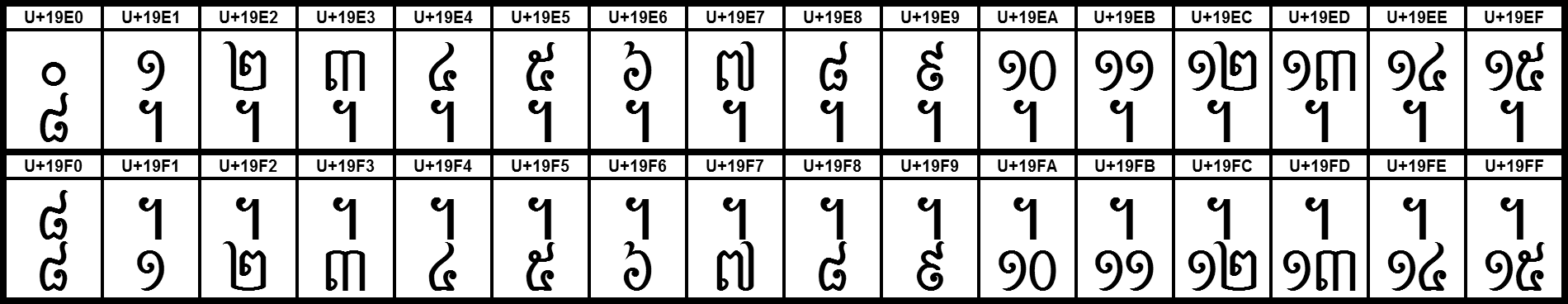
Graphical representation of the Khmer Symbols Unicode block

Khmer Symbols is a Unicode block containing lunar date symbols, used in the writing system of the Khmer (Cambodian) language. For further details see Khmer alphabet § Unicode.

Khmer Symbols^{[1]} Official Unicode Consortium code chart (PDF)
	0	1	2	3	4	5	6	7	8	9	A	B	C	D	E	F
U+19Ex	᧠	᧡	᧢	᧣	᧤	᧥	᧦	᧧	᧨	᧩	᧪	᧫	᧬	᧭	᧮	᧯
U+19Fx	᧰	᧱	᧲	᧳	᧴	᧵	᧶	᧷	᧸	᧹	᧺	᧻	᧼	᧽	᧾	᧿
Notes 1.As of Unicode version 17.0

== History ==
The following Unicode-related documents record the purpose and process of defining specific characters in the Khmer Symbols block:

Version	Final code points (Note: Proposed code points and characters names may differ from final code points and names)	Count	L2 ID	WG2 ID	Document
4.0	U+19E0..19FF	32	L2/02-101	N2471	Chea, Sok Huor; Lao, Kim Leang; Harada, Shiro; Klein, Norbert (2002-02-13), Proposal to add Khmer lunar dates
4.0	U+19E0..19FF	32	L2/02-070		Moore, Lisa (2002-08-26), "Consensus 90-C23", Minutes for UTC #90
