= Gimi language =

Papuan language

Gimi
- Labogai
- Native to: Papua New Guinea
- Region: Eastern Highlands Province
- Native speakers: (23,000 cited 2000)
- Language family: Proto-Trans–New Guinea: Trans–New Guinea; Kainantu–Goroka; Goroka; Gimi
- Dialects: Gouno

Language codes
- ISO 639-3: gim
- Glottolog: gimi1243

Gimi, also known as Labogai, is a Papuan language spoken in the Eastern Highlands Province in Papua New Guinea. 23,000 speakers (2000 cited) speak the Gimi language.

== Phonology ==
Gimi has 5 vowels and 12 consonants.

=== Vowels ===
	Front	Back
Close	i	u
Mid	e	o
Open		ɑ

=== Consonants ===
		Bilabial	Alveolar	Glottal
Nasal		m	n	
Plosive	voiceless	p	t	ʔ
Plosive	voiced	b	d	
Approximant				˷
Fricative	voiceless		s	h
Fricative	voiced		z	
Tap			ɾ	

- /p/ occurs word-initially only in loanwords.
- /b/ can surface as either [b] or [β] in free variation.
- /z/ becomes [s] before /ɑ/.
- /t/ and /ɾ/ tend to fluctuate word-initially.
- /ʔ ˷/ are cognate with velar consonants in other Goroka languages.
- /˷/ behaves phonologically like the voiced counterpart of /ʔ/; a true voiced glottal plosive is anatomically impossible.

=== Phonotactics ===
The syllable structure is (C)V(G), where G is either /ʔ/ or /˷/.

=== Tone ===
The final vowel of a word takes either a level or falling tone. The falling tone is written with an acute accent.

ak "seed"	ák "armband"
nimi "bird"	nimí "louse"

== Orthography ==
Gimi uses the Latin script.

IPA
ɑ	b	d	e	˷	h	i	ʔ	m	n	o	p	ɾ	s	t	u	z
Letter
a	b	d	e	g	h	i	k	m	n	o	p	r	s	t	u	z
