= Khmer script =

Abugida script for the Khmer language

Khmer Cambodian
- Âkkhârôkrâm Khmêr ("Khmer script") written in Khmer script
- Script type: Abugida
- Period: c. 611 – present
- Direction: Left-to-right
- Official script: Cambodia
- Languages: Khmer; Sanskrit; Pali; Jarai; Northern Khmer

Related scripts
- Parent systems: Egyptian hieroglyphs: Proto-Sinaitic; Phoenician; Aramaic; Brahmi; Tamil-Brahmi; Pallava; Khmer
- Child systems: Lai Tay, Khom Thai, Sukhothai
- Sister systems: Old Mon, Cham, Kawi, Grantha, Tamil

ISO 15924
- ISO 15924: Khmr (355), Khmer

Unicode
- Unicode alias: Khmer
- Unicode range: U+1780–U+17FF Khmer; U+19E0–U+19FF Khmer Symbols

Khmer script (Khmer: អក្សរខ្មែរ, Âksâr Khmêr [ʔaksɑː kʰmae]) is an abugida (alphasyllabary) script used to write the Khmer language, the official language of Cambodia. It is also used to write Pali in the Buddhist liturgy of Cambodia and Thailand.

Khmer is written from left to right. Words within the same sentence or phrase are generally run together with no spaces between them. Consonant clusters within a word are "stacked", with the second (and occasionally third) consonant being written in reduced form under the main consonant. Originally there were 35 consonant characters, but modern Khmer uses only 33. Each character represents a consonant sound together with an inherent vowel, either â or ô; in many cases, in the absence of another vowel mark, the inherent vowel is to be pronounced after the consonant.

There are some independent vowel characters, but vowel sounds are more commonly represented as dependent vowels, additional marks accompanying a consonant character, and indicating what vowel sound is to be pronounced after that consonant (or consonant cluster). Most dependent vowels have two different pronunciations, depending in most cases on the inherent vowel of the consonant to which they are added. There are also a number of diacritics used to indicate further modifications in pronunciation. The script also includes its own numerals and punctuation marks.

== Origin ==
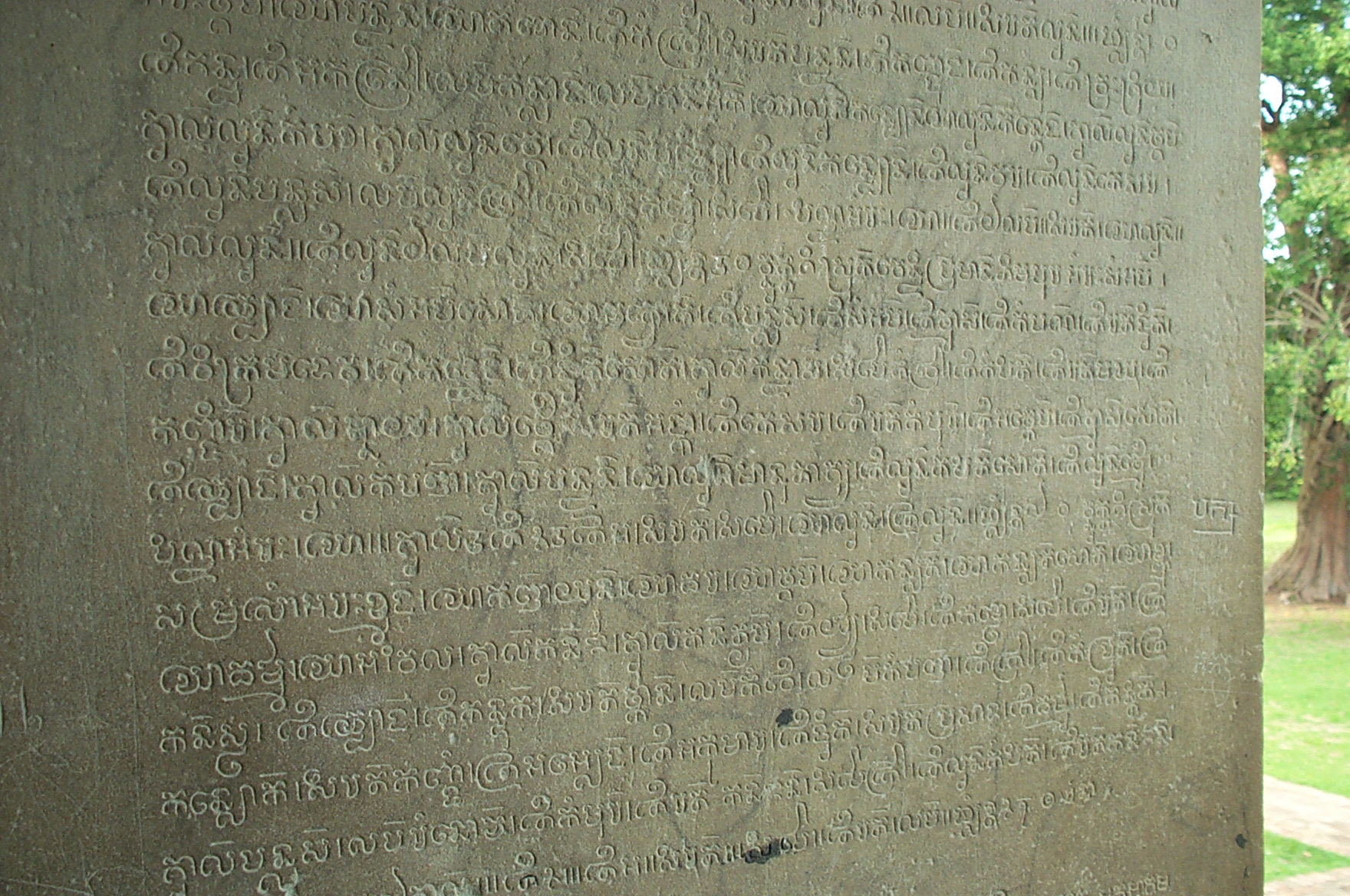
Ancient Khmer script engraved on stone

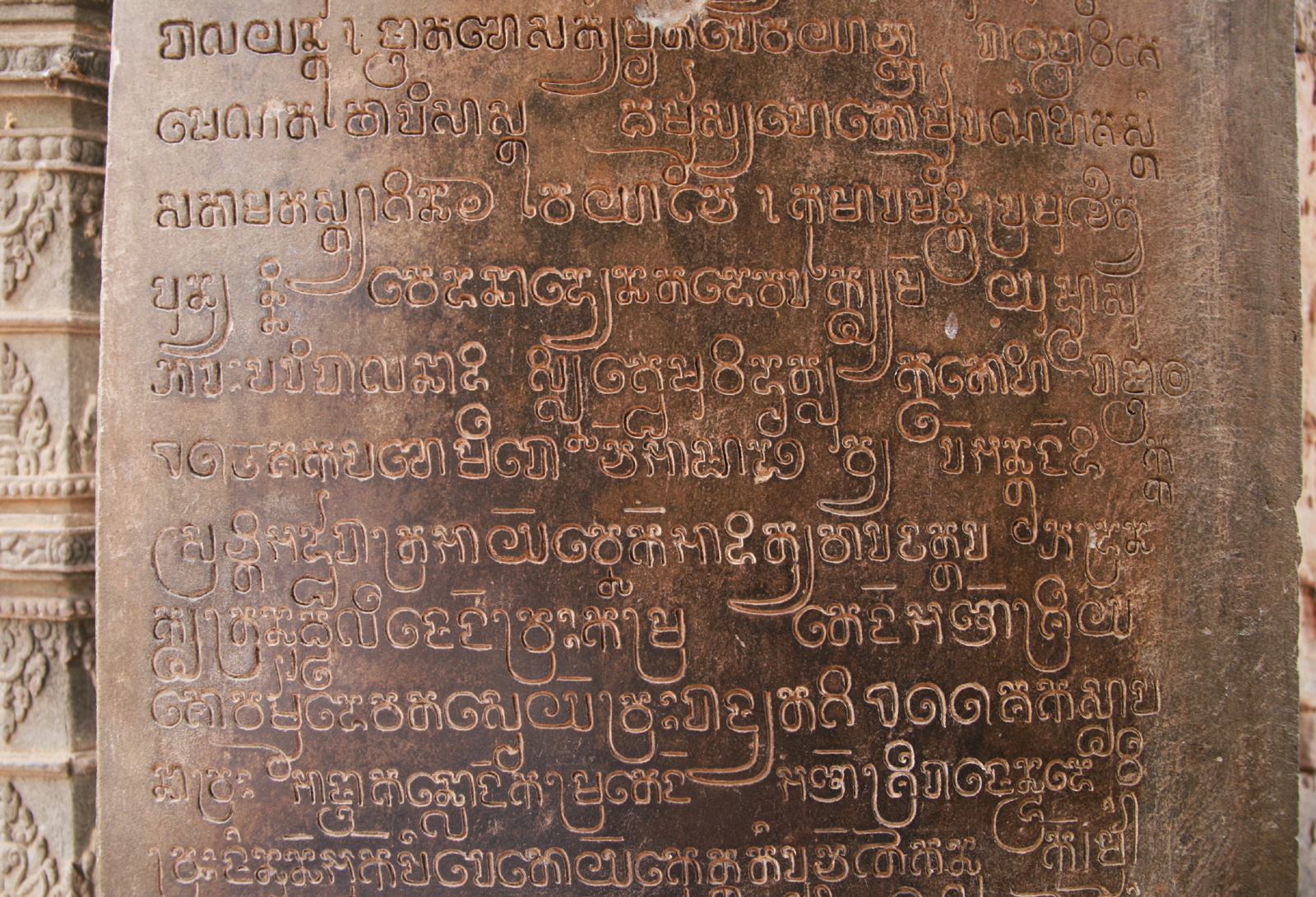
An inscription in Khmer script, at the temple of Lolei

The Khmer script was adapted from the Pallava script, used in southern India and Southeast Asia during the 5th and 6th centuries AD, which ultimately descended from the Tamil-Brahmi script. The oldest dated Khmer inscription was found at Angkor Borei District in Takéo Province south of Phnom Penh and dates from 611. Stelae of the Pre-Angkorean and Angkorean periods, featuring the Khmer script, have been found throughout the former Khmer Empire, from the Mekong Delta to what is now southern Laos, Northeast Thailand, and Central Thailand. Slight differences can be seen between ancient Khmer inscriptions written in Sanskrit and those written in Khmer. These two different systems have evolved into the modern âksâr mul and âksâr chriĕng styles of Khmer script. The former is used for sacred inscriptions while the latter is used for general use. The âksâr chriĕng style is a cursive form of âksâr mul, adapted to fit the Khmer language.

The oldest known record of the name “Khmer Script” (អក្សរខ្មែរ) is found in inscription K.362, dating to the late 9th century during the reign of King Yasovarman I. The inscription contains the Sanskrit term “Kāmvujākṣara”, written in Old Khmer “កម្វុជាក្សរ”. This serves as evidence that the Khmer people had a specific name for their script as early as the 9th century.

The modern Khmer script differs somewhat from precedent forms seen on the inscriptions of the ruins of Angkor. The Thai and Lao scripts are descendants of an older cursive form of the Khmer script, through the Sukhothai script.

== Consonants ==
There are 35 Khmer consonant symbols, although modern Khmer only uses 33, two having become obsolete. Each consonant has an inherent vowel: â /ɑː/ or ô /ɔː/; equivalently, each consonant is said to belong to the a-series or o-series. A consonant's series determines the pronunciation of the dependent vowel symbols which may be attached to it, and in some positions the sound of the inherent vowel is itself pronounced.

The two series originally represented voiceless and voiced consonants respectively (and are still referred to as such in Khmer). Sound changes during the Middle Khmer period affected vowels following voiceless consonants, and these changes were preserved even though the distinctive voicing was lost.

Each consonant, with one exception (ឡ), also has a subscript form. These may also be called "sub-consonants"; the Khmer phrase is ជើងអក្សរ cheung âksâr, meaning "foot of a letter". Most subscript consonants resemble the corresponding consonant symbol, but in a smaller and possibly simplified form, although in a few cases there is no obvious resemblance. Most subscript consonants are written directly below other consonants, although subscript r appears to the left, while a few others have ascending elements which appear to the right.

Subscripts are used in writing consonant clusters (consonants pronounced consecutively in a word with no vowel sound between them). Clusters in Khmer normally consist of two consonants, although occasionally in the middle of a word there will be three. The first consonant in a cluster is written using the main consonant symbol, with the second (and third, if present) attached to it in subscript form. Subscripts were previously also used to write final consonants; in modern Khmer this may be done, optionally, in some words ending -ng or -y, such as ឲ្យ aôy ("give").

The consonants and their subscript forms are listed in the following table. Usual phonetic values are given using the International Phonetic Alphabet (IPA); variations are described below the table. The sound system is described in detail at Khmer phonology. The spoken name of each consonant letter is its value together with its inherent vowel. Transliterations are given using the transcription system of the Geographic Department of the Cambodian Ministry of Land Management and Urban Planning used by the Cambodian government and the UNGEGN system; for other systems see Romanization of Khmer.

Consonant	Subscript form	Name/Full value (with inherent vowel)				Consonant value			
Consonant	Subscript form	UNGEGN	GD	ALA-LC	IPA	UNGEGN	GD	ALA-LC	IPA
ក	្ក	kâ	ka	ka	[kɑː]	k	k	k	[k]
ខ	្ខ	khâ	kha	kha	[kʰɑː]	kh	kh	kh	[kʰ]
គ	្គ	kô	ko	ga	[kɔː]	k	k	g	[k]
ឃ	្ឃ	khô	kho	gha	[kʰɔː]	kh	kh	gh	[kʰ]
ង	្ង	ngô	ngo	nga	[ŋɔː]	ng	ng	ng	[ŋ]
ច	្ច	châ	cha	ca	[cɑː]	ch	ch	c	[c]
ឆ	្ឆ	chhâ	chha	cha	[cʰɑː]	chh	chh	ch	[cʰ]
ជ	្ជ	chô	cho	ja	[cɔː]	ch	ch	j	[c]
ឈ	្ឈ	chhô	chho	jha	[cʰɔː]	chh	chh	jh	[cʰ]
ញ	្ញ	nhô	nho	ña	[ɲɔː]	nh	nh	ñ	[ɲ]
ដ	្ដ	dâ	da	ṭa	[ɗɑː]	d	d	ṭ	[ɗ]
ឋ	្ឋ	thâ	tha	ṭha	[tʰɑː]	th	th	ṭh	[tʰ]
ឌ	្ឌ	dô	do	ḍa	[ɗɔː]	d	d	ḍ	[ɗ]
ឍ	្ឍ	thô	tho	ḍha	[tʰɔː]	th	th	ḍh	[tʰ]
ណ	្ណ	nâ	na	ṇa	[nɑː]	n	n	ṇ	[n]
ត	្ត	tâ	ta	ta	[tɑː]	t	t	t	[t]
ថ	្ថ	thâ	tha	tha	[tʰɑː]	th	th	th	[tʰ]
ទ	្ទ	tô	to	da	[tɔː]	t	t	d	[t]
ធ	្ធ	thô	tho	dha	[tʰɔː]	th	th	dh	[tʰ]
ន	្ន	nô	no	na	[nɔː]	n	n	n	[n]
ប	្ប	bâ	ba	pa	[ɓɑː]	b, p	b, p	p	[ɓ], [p]
ផ	្ផ	phâ	pha	pha	[pʰɑː]	ph	ph	ph	[pʰ]
ព	្ព	pô	po	ba	[pɔː]	p	p	b	[p]
ភ	្ភ	phô	pho	bha	[pʰɔː]	ph	ph	bh	[pʰ]
ម	្ម	mô	mo	ma	[mɔː]	m	m	m	[m]
យ	្យ	yô	yo	ya	[jɔː]	y	y	y	[j]
រ	្រ	rô	ro	ra	[rɔː]	r	r	r	[r]
ល	្ល	lô	lo	la	[lɔː]	l	l	l	[l]
វ	្វ	vô	vo	va	[ʋɔː]	v	v	v	[ʋ]
ឝ	្ឝ	śâ	śa	śa	[ɕɑː]	ś	ś	ś	[ɕ]
ឞ	្ឞ	ṣâ	ṣa	ṣa	[ʂɑː]	ṣ	ṣ	ṣ	[ʂ]
ស	្ស	sâ	sa	sa	[sɑː]	s	s	s	[s]
ហ	្ហ	hâ	ha	ha	[hɑː]	h	h	h	[h]
ឡ	none	lâ	la	ḷa	[lɑː]	l	l	ḷ	[l]
អ	្អ	'â	'a	ʿʹa	[ʔɑː]	'	'	ʿʹ	[ʔ]

The letter ប bâ appears in somewhat modified form (e.g. បា) when combined with certain dependent vowels (see Ligatures).

The letter ញ nhô is written without the lower curve when a subscript is added. When it is subscripted to itself, the subscript is a smaller form of the entire letter: ញ្ញ -nhnh-.

Note that ដ dâ and ត tâ have the same subscript form. In initial clusters this subscript is always pronounced [ɗ], but in medial positions it is [ɗ] in some words and [t] in others.

The series ដ dâ, ឋ thâ, ឌ dô, ឍ thô, ណ nâ originally represented retroflex consonants in the Indic parent scripts. The second, third and fourth of these are rare, and occur only for etymological reasons in a few Pali and Sanskrit loanwords. Because the sound /n/ is common, and often grammatically productive, in Mon-Khmer languages, the fifth of this group, ណ, was adapted as an a-series counterpart of ន nô for convenience (all other nasal consonants are o-series).

The letters ឝ śa and ឞ ṣa are obsolete and are used only for Pali/Sanskrit transliteration. Historically ឝ was used for palatal s and ឞ was used for retroflex s.

=== Variation in pronunciation ===
The aspirated consonant letters (kh-, chh-, th-, ph-) are pronounced with aspiration only before a vowel. There is also slight aspiration with k, ch, t and p sounds before certain consonants, but this is regardless of whether they are spelt with a letter that indicates aspiration.

A Khmer word cannot end with more than one consonant sound, so subscript consonants at the end of words (which appear for etymological reasons) are not pronounced, although they may come to be pronounced when the same word begins a compound.

In some words, a single medial consonant symbol represents both the final consonant of one syllable and the initial consonant of the next.

The letter ប bâ represents [ɓ] only before a vowel. When final or followed by a subscript consonant ល, it is pronounced [p] (and in the case where it is followed by a subscript consonant, it is also romanized as p in the UN system). For modification to p by means of a diacritic, see Supplementary consonants. The letter, which represented /p/ in Indic scripts, also often maintains the [p] sound in certain words borrowed from Sanskrit and Pali.

The letters ដ dâ and ឌ dô are pronounced [t] when final. The letter ត tâ is pronounced [ɗ] in initial position in a weak syllable ending with a nasal.

In final position, letters representing a [k] sound (k-, kh-) are pronounced as a glottal stop [ʔ] after the vowels [ɑː], [aː], [iə], [ɨə], [uə], [ɑ], [a], [ĕə], [ŭə]. The letter រ rô is silent when final (in most dialects; see Northern Khmer). The letter ស sâ when final is pronounced /h/ (which in this position approaches [ç]).

=== Supplementary consonants ===
The Khmer writing system includes supplementary consonants, used in certain loanwords, particularly from French and Thai. These mostly represent sounds which do not occur in native words, or for which the native letters are restricted to one of the two vowel series. Most of them are digraphs, formed by stacking a subscript under the letter ហ hâ, with an additional treisăpt diacritic if required to change the inherent vowel to ô. The character for pâ, however, is formed by placing the musĕkâtônd ("mouse teeth") diacritic over the character ប bâ.

Supplementary consonant	Description	Full value (with inherent vowel)				Consonant value				Notes
Supplementary consonant	Description	UNGEGN	GD	ALA-LC	IPA	UNGEGN	GD	ALA-LC	IPA	Notes
ហ្គ	hâ + kô	hkâ	hka	hga	[ɡɑː]	hk	hk	hg	[ɡ]	Example: ហ្គាស hkas [ɡaːh] ('gas'; from French gaz)
ហ្គ៊	hâ + kô + diacritic	hkô	hko	hg′a	[ɡɔː]	hk	hk	hg′	[ɡ]	Example: ហ្គ៊ារ hkéar [giə] ('train station'; from French gare)
ហ្ន	hâ + nô	hnâ	hna	hna	[nɑː]	hn	hn	hn	[n]	Example: ហ្នាំង/ហ្ន័ង hnăng [naŋ] ('shadow play' from Thai หนัง nǎng)
ប៉	bâ + diacritic	pâ	pa	p′′a	[pɑː]	p	p	p′′	[p]	Example: ប៉ាក់ păk [pak] ('to embroider'), ប៉័ង păng [paŋ] ('bread'; from French pain)
ហ្ម	hâ + mô	hmâ	hma	hma	[mɑː]	hm	hm	hm	[m]	Example: គ្រូហ្ម kru hmâ [kruː mɑː] ('shaman'; from Thai หมอ mɔ̌ɔ)
ហ្ល	hâ + lô	hlâ	hla	hla	[lɑː]	hl	hl	hl	[l]	Example: ហ្លួង hluŏng [luəŋ] ('king'; from Thai หลวง lǔuang)
ហ្វ	hâ + vô	hvâ	hva	hva	[fɑː], [ʋɑː]	hv	hv	hv	[f], [ʋ]	Pronounced [ʋ] in ហ្វង់ hváng [ʋɑŋ] ('clear'), [f] in កាហ្វេ kahvé [kaːfeː] ('coffee'; from French café)
ហ្វ៊	hâ + vô + diacritic	hvô	hvo	hv′a	[fɔː], [ʋɔː]	hv	hv	hv′	[f], [ʋ]	Example: ហ្វ៊ីល hvil [fiːl] ('film'; from French film)
ហ្ស	hâ + sâ	hsâ	hsa	hsa	[zɑː], [ʒɑː]	hs	hs	hs	[z], [ʒ]	Example: ហ្សាស hsas [ʒaːh] ('jazz'; from French jazz), ភីហ្សា phihsa [pʰiːzaː] ('pizza')
ហ្ស៊	hâ + sâ + diacritic	hsô	hso	hs′a	[zɔː], [ʒɔː]	hs	hs	hs′	[z], [ʒ]	Example: ហ្ស៊ីប hsib [ʒiːp] ('jeep'; from French jeep), ហ្សឺណេវ hsœnév [zəːneːw] ('Geneva'; from French Genève)

== Dependent vowels ==
Most Khmer vowel sounds are written using dependent, or diacritical, vowel symbols, known in Khmer as ស្រៈនិស្ស័យ srăk nĭssăy or ស្រៈផ្សំ srăk phsâm ("connecting vowel"). These can only be written in combination with a consonant (or consonant cluster). The vowel is pronounced after the consonant (or cluster), even though some of the symbols have graphical elements which appear above, below or to the left of the consonant character.

Most of the vowel symbols have two possible pronunciations, depending on the inherent vowel of the consonant to which it is added. Their pronunciations may also be different in weak syllables, and when they are shortened (e.g. by means of a diacritic). Absence of a dependent vowel (or diacritic) often implies that a syllable-initial consonant is followed by the sound of its inherent vowel.

In determining the inherent vowel of a consonant cluster (i.e. how a following dependent vowel will be pronounced), stops and fricatives are dominant over sonorants. For any consonant cluster including a combination of these sounds, a following dependent vowel is pronounced according to the dominant consonant, regardless of its position in the cluster. When both members of a cluster are dominant, the subscript consonant determines the pronunciation of a following dependent vowel.

A non-dominant consonant (and in some words also ហ hâ) will also have its inherent vowel changed by a preceding dominant consonant in the same word, even when there is a vowel between them, although some words (especially among those with more than two syllables) do not obey this rule.

The dependent vowels are listed below, in conventional form with a dotted circle as a dummy consonant symbol, and in combination with the a-series letter អ ’â. The IPA values given are representative of dialects from the northwest and central plains regions, specifically from the Battambang area, upon which Standard Khmer is based. Vowel pronunciation varies widely in other dialects such as Northern Khmer, where diphthongs are leveled, and Western Khmer, in which breathy voice and modal voice phonations are still contrastive.

Dependent vowel	Example	IPA		GD		UNGEGN		ALA-LC	Notes
Dependent vowel	Example	a-series	o-series	a-series	o-series	a-series	o-series	ALA-LC	Notes
(none)	អ	[ɑː], [ɒː] in some dialects	[ɔː]	a	o	â	ô	a	See Modification by diacritics and Consonants with no dependent vowel.
ា	អា	[aː]	[iːə]	a	ea	a	éa	ā	See Modification by diacritics. អ៊ា, the o-series of ា, is slightly distinct from ៀ. (អ៊ា ~ "air" vs ៀ ~ "ear")
ិ	អិ	[ə], [e]	[ɨ], [i]	e	i	ĕ	ĭ	i	Pronounced [e]/[i] in syllables with no written final consonant (a glottal stop is then added if the syllable is stressed; however in some words the vowel is silent when final, and in some words in which it is not word-final it is pronounced [əj]). In the o-series, combines with final យ yô to sound [iː]. (See also Modification by diacritics.)
ី	អី	[ej]	[iː]	ei	i	ei	i	ī	
ឹ	អឹ	[ə]	[ɨ]	oe	ue	œ̆		ẏ	
ឺ	អឺ	[əː]	[ɨː]	eu	ueu	œ		ȳ	
ុ	អុ	[o]	[u]	o	u	ŏ	ŭ	u	See Modification by diacritics. In a stressed syllable with no written final consonant, the vowel is followed by a glottal stop [ʔ], or by [k] in the word តុ tŏk ("table") (but the vowel is silent when final in certain words).
ូ	អូ	[oː]	[uː]	ou	u	o	u	ū	Becomes [əw]/[ɨw] before a final វ vô.
ួ	អួ	[uə]		uo		uŏ		ua	
ើ	អើ	[aə]	[əː]	aeu	eu	aeu	eu	oe	See Modification by diacritics.
ឿ	អឿ	[ɨə]		oea		œă		ẏa	
ៀ	អៀ	[iə]		ie		iĕ		ia	
េ	អេ	[eː]		e		é		e	Becomes [ə]/[ɨ] before palatals (or in the a-series, [a] before [c] in some words). Pronounced [ae]/[ɛː] in some words. See also Modification by diacritics.
ែ	អែ	[ae]	[ɛː]	ae	eae	ê		ae	See Modification by diacritics.
ៃ	អៃ	[ej]	[aj]	ai	ey	ai	ey	ai	
ោ	អោ	[ao]	[oː]	ao	ou	aô	oŭ	o	See Modification by diacritics.
ៅ	អៅ	[aɨ]	[əɨ]	au	ov	au	ŏu	au	

The spoken name of each dependent vowel consists of the word ស្រៈ srăk [sraʔ]("vowel") followed by the vowel's a-series value preceded by a glottal stop (and also followed by a glottal stop in the case of short vowels).

=== Modification by diacritics ===
The addition of some of the Khmer diacritics can modify the length and value of inherent or dependent vowels.

The following table shows combinations with the nĭkkôhĕt and reăhmŭkh diacritics, representing final [m] and [h]. They are shown with the a-series consonant អ ’â.

Combination	IPA		GD		UNGEGN		ALA-LC	Notes
Combination	a-series	o-series	a-series	o-series	a-series	o-series	ALA-LC	Notes
អុំ	[om]	[um]	om	um	om	ŭm	uṃ	
អំ	[ɑm]	[um]	am	um	âm	um	aṃ	The word ធំ thum ("big") is pronounced [tʰom] (but [tʰum] in some dialects).
អាំ	[am]	[ŏəm]	am	oam	ăm	ŏâm	āṃ	When followed by ង ngô, becomes [aŋ]/[eəŋ] ăng/eăng.
អះ	[ah]	[ĕəh]	ah	eah	ăh	eăh	aḥ	
អិះ	[eh]	[ih]	eh	is	ĕh	ĭh	iḥ	
អុះ	[oh]	[uh]	oh	uh	ŏh	ŭh	uḥ	
អេះ	[eh]	[ih]	eh		éh		eḥ	
អោះ	[ɑh]	[ŭəh]	aoh	uoh	aôh	ŏăh	oaḥ	The word នោះ nŏăh ("that") can be pronounced [nuh].

The first four configurations listed here are treated as dependent vowels in their own right, and have names constructed in the same way as for the other dependent vowels (described in the previous section).

Other rarer configurations with the reăhmŭkh are អើះ (or អឹះ), pronounced [əh], and អែះ, pronounced [eh]. The word ចា៎ះ "yes" (used by women) is pronounced [caː] and rarely [caːh].

The bânták (a small vertical line written over the final consonant of a syllable) has the following effects:

- in a syllable with inherent â, the vowel is shortened to [ɑ], UN transcription á
- in a syllable with inherent ô, the vowel is modified to [u] before a final labial, otherwise usually to [ŏə]; UN transcription ó
- in a syllable with the a dependent vowel symbol (ា) in the a-series, the vowel is shortened to [a], UN transcription ă
- in a syllable with that vowel symbol in the o-series, the vowel is modified to [ŏə], UN transcription oă, or to [ĕə] eă before k, ng, h (ក,គ,ង,ហ)

The sanhyoŭk sannha is equivalent to the a dependent vowel with the bântăk. However, its o-series pronunciation becomes [ɨ] before final y, and [ɔə] before final (silent) r.

The yŭkôlpĭntŭ (pair of dots) represents [a] (a-series) or [ĕə] (o-series), followed by a glottal stop.

=== Consonants with no dependent vowel ===
There are three environments where a consonant may appear without a dependent vowel. The rules governing the inherent vowel differ for all three environments. Consonants may be written with no dependent vowel as an initial consonant of a weak syllable, an initial consonant of a strong syllable or as the final letter of a written word.

In careful speech, initial consonants without a dependent vowel in weak initial syllables are pronounced with their inherent vowel shortened as if modified by the bânták diacritic (see previous section). For example the first-series letter "ច" in "ចន្លុះ" ("torch") is pronounced with the short vowel /ɑ/. The second-series letter "ព" in "ពន្លឺ" ("light") is pronounced with the short diphthong /ŏə/. In casual speech, these are most often reduced to /ə/ for both series.

Initial consonants in strong syllables without written vowels are pronounced with their inherent vowels. The word ចង ("to tie") is pronounced [cɑːŋ], ជត ("weak", "to sink") is pronounced [cɔːt]. In some words, however, the inherent vowel is pronounced in its reduced form, as if modified by a bântăk diacritic, even though the diacritic is not written (e.g. សព [sɑp] "corpse"). Such reduction regularly takes place in words ending with a consonant with a silent subscript (such as សព្វ [sɑp] "every"), although in most such words it is the bânták-reduced form of the vowel a that is heard, as in សព្ទ [sap] "noise". The word អ្នក "you, person" has the highly irregular pronunciation [nĕəʔ].

Consonants written as the final letter of a word usually represent a word-final sound and are pronounced without any following vowel and, in the case of stops, with no audible release as in the examples above. However, in some words adopted from Pali and Sanskrit, what would appear to be a final consonant under normal rules can actually be the initial consonant of a following syllable and pronounced with a short vowel as if followed by ាក់. For example, according to rules for native Khmer words, សុភ ("good", "clean", "beautiful") would appear to be a single syllable, but, being derived from Pali subha, it is pronounced [sopʰĕəʔ].

=== Ligatures ===
Most consonants, including a few of the subscripts, form ligatures with the vowel a (ា) and with all other dependent vowels that contain the same cane-like symbol. Most of these ligatures are easily recognizable, but a few may not be, particularly those involving the letter ប bâ. This combines with the a vowel in the form បា, created to differentiate it from the consonant symbol ហ hâ and also from the ligature for ច châ with a (ចា).

Some more examples of ligatured symbols follow:

បៅ bau [ɓaw] Another example with ប bâ, forming a similar ligature to that described above. Here the vowel is not a itself, but another vowel (au) which contains the cane-like stroke of that vowel as a graphical element.

លា léa [liə] An example of the vowel a forming a connection with the serif of a consonant.

ផ្បា phba [pʰɓaː] Subscript consonants with ascending strokes above the baseline also form ligatures with the a vowel symbol.

ម្សៅ msau [msaw] Another example of a subscript consonant forming a ligature, this time with the vowel au.

ត្រា tra [traː] The subscript for រ rô is written to the left of the main consonant, in this case ត tâ, which here forms a ligature with a.

== Independent vowels ==
Independent vowels are non-diacritical vowel characters that stand alone (i.e. without being attached to a consonant symbol). In Khmer they are called ស្រៈពេញតួ sră pénh tuŏ, which means "complete vowels". They are used in some words to represent certain combinations of a vowel with an initial glottal stop or liquid. The independent vowels are used in a small number of words, mostly of Indic origin, and consequently there is some inconsistency in their use and pronunciations. However, a few words in which they occur are used quite frequently; these include: ឥឡូវ ĕlov [ʔəjləw] "now", ឪពុក âupŭk [ʔəwpuk] "father", ឬ rœ [rɨː] "or", ឮ lœ [lɨː] "hear", ឲ្យ aôy [ʔaoj] "give, let", ឯង êng [ʔaeŋ] "oneself, I, you", ឯណា ê na [ʔae naː] "where".

Independent vowel	IPA	GD	UNGEGN
ឥ	[ʔə], [ʔɨ], [ʔəj]	e	ĕ
ឦ	[ʔəj]	ei	ei
ឧ	[ʔo], [ʔu], [ʔao]	o	ŏ, ŭ
ឨ	Obsolete (equivalent to the sequence ឧក)		
ឩ	[ʔou], [ʔuː]	ou	not given
ឪ	[ʔəw]	au	âu
ឫ	[rɨ]	rue	rœ̆
ឬ	[rɨː]	rueu	rœ
ឭ	[lɨ]	lue	lœ̆
ឮ	[lɨː]	lueu	lœ
ឯ	[ʔae], [ʔɛː], [ʔeː]	ae	ê
ឰ	[ʔaj]	ai	ai
ឱ, ឲ	[ʔao]	ao	aô
ឳ	[ʔaw]	au	au

Independent vowel letters are named similarly to the dependent vowels, with the word ស្រៈ sră [sraʔ] ("vowel") followed by the principal sound of the letter (the pronunciation or first of the pronunciations listed above), followed by an additional glottal stop after a short vowel. However the letter ឥ is called ស្រៈឥ sră ĕ [sraʔ ʔeʔ].

== Diacritics ==
The Khmer writing system contains several diacritics (វណ្ណយុត្តិ, vônnâyŭttĕ, pronounced [ʋannajut]), used to indicate further modifications in pronunciation.

Diacritic	Khmer name	Function
ំ	និគ្គហិត nĭkkôhĕt	The Pali niggahīta, related to the anusvara. A small circle written over a consonant or a following dependent vowel, it nasalizes the inherent or dependent vowel, with the addition of [m]; long vowels are also shortened. For details see Modification by diacritics.
ះ	រះមុខ reăhmŭkh "shining face"	Related to the visarga. A pair of small circles written after a consonant or a following dependent vowel, it modifies and adds final aspiration /h/ to the inherent or dependent vowel. For details see Modification by diacritics.
ៈ	យុគលពិន្ទុ yŭkoălpĭntŭ	A "pair of dots", a fairly recently introduced diacritic, written after a consonant to indicate that it is to be followed by a short vowel and a glottal stop. See Modification by diacritics.
៉	មូសិកទន្ត musĕkâtônd "mouse teeth"	Two short vertical lines, written above a consonant, used to convert some o-series consonants (ង ញ ម យ រ វ) to a-series. It is also used with ប bâ to convert it to a p sound (see Supplementary consonants).
៊	ត្រីស័ព្ទ treisăpt	A wavy line, written above a consonant, used to convert some a-series consonants (ស ហ ប អ) to o-series.
ុ	ក្បៀសក្រោម kbiĕs kraôm	Also known as បុកជើង bŏk cheung ("collision foot"); a vertical line written under a consonant, used in place of the diacritics treisăpt and musĕkâtônd when they would be impeded by superscript vowels.
់	បន្តក់ bânták	A small vertical line written over the last consonant of a syllable, indicating shortening (and corresponding change in quality) of certain vowels. See Modification by diacritics.
៌	របាទ rôbat រេផៈ réphă	This superscript diacritic occurs in Sanskrit loanwords and corresponds to the Devanagari diacritic repha. It originally represented an r sound (and is romanized as r in the UNGEGN system). Now, in most cases, the consonant above which it appears, and the diacritic itself, are unpronounced. Examples: ធម៌ thôrm [tʰɔə] ("dharma"), កាណ៌ karn [kaː] (from karṇa), សួគ៌ា suŏrkéa [suəkiə] ("Svarga").
៍	ទណ្ឌឃាដ tôndôkhéad	Written over a final consonant to indicate that it is unpronounced. (Such unpronounced letters are still romanized in the UNGEGN system.)
៎	កាកបាទ kakâbat	Also known as a "crow's foot", used in writing to indicate the rising intonation of an exclamation or interjection; often placed on particles such as /na/, /nɑː/, /nɛː/, /ʋəːj/, and on ចា៎ះ /caːh/, a word for "yes" used by females.
៏	អស្តា âsda "number eight"	Used in a few words to show that a consonant with no dependent vowel is to be pronounced with its inherent vowel, rather than as a final consonant.
័	សំយោគសញ្ញា sâmyoŭk sânhnhéa	Used in some Sanskrit and Pali loanwords (although alternative spellings usually exist); it is written above a consonant to indicate that the syllable contains a particular short vowel; see Modification by diacritics.
៑	វិរាម vĭréam	A mostly obsolete diacritic, corresponding to the virāma, which suppresses a consonant's inherent vowel.

== Dictionary order ==
For the purpose of dictionary ordering of words, main consonants, subscript consonants and dependent vowels are all significant; and when they appear in combination, they are considered in the order in which they would be spoken (main consonant, subscript, vowel). The order of the consonants and of the dependent vowels is the order in which they appear in the above tables. A syllable written without any dependent vowel is treated as if it contained a vowel character that precedes all the visible dependent vowels.

As mentioned above, the four configurations with diacritics exemplified in the syllables អុំ អំ អាំ អះ are treated as dependent vowels in their own right, and come in that order at the end of the list of dependent vowels. Other configurations with the reăhmŭkh diacritic are ordered as if that diacritic were a final consonant coming after all other consonants. Words with the bânták and sâmyoŭk sânhnhéa diacritics are ordered directly after identically spelled words without the diacritics.

Vowels precede consonants in the ordering, so a combination of main and subscript consonants comes after any instance in which the same main consonant appears unsubscripted before a vowel.

Words spelled with an independent vowel whose sound begins with a glottal stop follow after words spelled with the equivalent combination of អ ’â plus dependent vowel. Words spelled with an independent vowel whose sound begins [r] or [l] follow after all words beginning with the consonants រ rô and ល lô respectively.

Words spelled with a consonant modified by a diacritic follow words spelled with the same consonant and dependent vowel symbol but without the diacritic. However, words spelled with ប៉ (a bâ converted to a p sound by a diacritic) follow all words with unmodified ប bâ (without diacritic and without subscript). Sometimes words in which ប is pronounced p are ordered as if the letter were written ប៉.

== Numerals ==
The numerals of the Khmer script, similar to that used by other civilizations in Southeast Asia, are also derived from the southern Indian script. Western-style Arabic numerals are also used, but to a lesser extent.

0 ០	1 ១	2 ២	3 ៣	4 ៤	5 ៥	6 ៦	7 ៧	8 ៨	9 ៩

In large numbers, groups of three digits are delimited with Western-style periods. The decimal point is represented by a comma. The Cambodian currency, the riel, is abbreviated using the symbol ៛ or simply the letter រ rô.

There also are "numeric symbols for divination lore" which are not used for calculation.

0 ៰	1 ៱	2 ៲	3 ៳	4 ៴	5 ៵	6 ៶	7 ៷	8 ៸	9 ៹

== Spacing and punctuation ==
Spaces are not used between all words in written Khmer. Spaces are used within sentences in roughly the same places as commas might be in English, although they may also serve to set off certain items such as numbers and proper names.

Western-style punctuation marks are quite commonly used in modern Khmer writing, including French-style guillemets for quotation marks. However, traditional Khmer punctuation marks are also used; some of these are described in the following table.

Mark	Khmer name	Function
។	ខណ្ឌ khând	Used as a period (the sign resembles an eighth rest in music writing). However, consecutive sentences on the same theme are often separated only by spaces.
៘	ល៉ៈ lăk	Equivalent to etc.
ៗ	លេខទោ lékh toŭ ("figure two")	Duplication sign (similar in form to the Khmer numeral for 2). It indicates that the preceding word or phrase is to be repeated (duplicated), a common feature in Khmer syntax.
៕	បរិយោសាន bârĭyoŭsan	A period used to end an entire text or a chapter.
៚	គោមូត្រ koŭmutr ("cow urine")	A period used at the end of poetic or religious texts.
៙	ភ្នែកមាន់ phnêk moăn ("cock's eye")	A symbol (said to represent the elephant trunk of Ganesha) used at the start of poetic or religious texts.
៖	ចំណុចពីរគូស châmnŏch pir kus "two dots (and a) line"	Used similarly to a colon. (The middle line distinguishes this sign from a diacritic.)

A hyphen (សហសញ្ញា sâhâ sânhnhéa) is commonly used between components of personal names, and also as in English when a word is divided between lines of text. It can also be used between numbers to denote ranges or dates. Particular uses of Western-style periods include grouping of digits in large numbers (see Numerals hereinbefore) and denotation of abbreviations.

== Styles ==
Several styles of Khmer writing are used for varying purposes. The two main styles are âksâr chriĕng (literally "slanted script") and âksâr mul ("round script").

- Âksâr chriĕng (អក្សរជ្រៀង) refers to oblique letters. Entire bodies of text such as novels and other publications may be produced in âksâr chriĕng. Oblique lettering does not represent any grammatical differences such as emphasis or quotation. Handwritten Khmer is often written in the oblique style.
- Âksâr chhôr (អក្សរឈរ) or Âksâr tráng (អក្សរត្រង់) refers to upright or 'standing' letters, as opposed to oblique letters. Most modern Khmer typefaces are designed in this manner instead of being oblique, as text can be italicized by way of word processor commands and other computer applications to represent the oblique manner of âksâr chriĕng.
- Âksâr khâm (អក្សរខម), also known as the Khom Thai script, is a style used in Pali palm-leaf manuscripts. It is characterized by sharper serifs and angles and retainment of some antique characteristics, notably in the consonant kâ (ក). This style is also for yantra tattoos and yantras on cloth, paper, or engravings on brass plates in Cambodia as well as in Thailand.
- Âksâr mul (អក្សរមូល) is calligraphical style similar to âksâr khâm as it also retains some characters reminiscent of antique Khmer script. Its name in Khmer means literally 'round script' and it refers to the bold and thick lettering style. It is used for titles and headings in Cambodian documents, on books, banknotes, shop signs and banners. It is sometimes used to emphasize royal names or other important names.
âksâr chriĕng

âksâr chhôr

âksâr khâm

âksâr mul

== Unicode ==
The basic Khmer block was added to the Unicode Standard in version 3.0, released in September 1999. It then contained 103 defined code points; this was extended to 114 in version 4.0, released in April 2003. Version 4.0 also introduced an additional block, called Khmer Symbols, containing 32 signs used for writing lunar dates.

The Unicode block for basic Khmer characters is U+1780–U+17FF:

Khmer^{[1]}^{[2]}^{[3]} Official Unicode Consortium code chart (PDF)
	0	1	2	3	4	5	6	7	8	9	A	B	C	D	E	F
U+178x	ក	ខ	គ	ឃ	ង	ច	ឆ	ជ	ឈ	ញ	ដ	ឋ	ឌ	ឍ	ណ	ត
U+179x	ថ	ទ	ធ	ន	ប	ផ	ព	ភ	ម	យ	រ	ល	វ	ឝ	ឞ	ស
U+17Ax	ហ	ឡ	អ	ឣ	ឤ	ឥ	ឦ	ឧ	ឨ	ឩ	ឪ	ឫ	ឬ	ឭ	ឮ	ឯ
U+17Bx	ឰ	ឱ	ឲ	ឳ	KIV; AQ	KIV; AA	ា	ិ	ី	ឹ	ឺ	ុ	ូ	ួ	ើ	ឿ
U+17Cx	ៀ	េ	ែ	ៃ	ោ	ៅ	ំ	ះ	ៈ	៉	៊	់	៌	៍	៎	៏
U+17Dx	័	៑	្	៓	។	៕	៖	ៗ	៘	៙	៚	៛	ៜ	៝		
U+17Ex	០	១	២	៣	៤	៥	៦	៧	៨	៩						
U+17Fx	៰	៱	៲	៳	៴	៵	៶	៷	៸	៹						
Notes 1.As of Unicode version 17.0 2.Grey areas indicate non-assigned code points 3.U+17A3 and U+17A4 are deprecated as of Unicode versions 4.0 and 5.2 respectively

The first 35 characters are the consonant letters (including two obsolete). The symbols at U+17A3 and U+17A4 are deprecated (they were intended for use in Pali and Sanskrit transliteration, but are identical in appearance to the consonant អ, written alone or with the a vowel). These are followed by the 15 independent vowels (including one obsolete and one variant form). The code points U+17B4 and U+17B5 are invisible combining marks for inherent vowels, intended for use only in special applications.

Next come the 16 dependent vowel signs and the 12 diacritics (excluding the kbiĕh kraôm, which is identical in form to the ŏ dependent vowel); these are represented together with a dotted circle, but should be displayed appropriately in combination with a preceding Khmer letter.

The code point U+17D2, called ជើង ceung, meaning "foot", is used to indicate that a following consonant is to be written in subscript form. It is not normally visibly rendered as a character. U+17D3 was originally intended for use in writing lunar dates, but its use is now discouraged (see the Khmer Symbols block hereafter). The next seven characters are the punctuation marks listed hereinbefore; these are followed by the riel currency symbol, a rare sign corresponding to the Sanskrit avagraha, and a mostly obsolete version of the vĭréam diacritic. The U+17Ex series contains the Khmer numerals, and the U+17Fx series contains variants of the numerals used in divination lore.

Unicode had inadequately described what constitutes a valid syllable and what order a syllable's codepoints should go in, creating homoglyphic codepoint sequences, compelling vendors to devise their own incompatible definitions, and burdening typists with the task of creating sequences that render correctly. For example, the word for "woman" could be encoded with 12 different sequences, with ⟨srti⟩ being more common than ⟨stri⟩. In 2025, Martin Hosken (SIL, NPIC) wrote a document clarifying these issues and ensuring that a certain visual result has only one valid encoding.

The block with additional lunar date symbols is U+19E0–U+19FF:

Khmer Symbols^{[1]} Official Unicode Consortium code chart (PDF)
	0	1	2	3	4	5	6	7	8	9	A	B	C	D	E	F
U+19Ex	᧠	᧡	᧢	᧣	᧤	᧥	᧦	᧧	᧨	᧩	᧪	᧫	᧬	᧭	᧮	᧯
U+19Fx	᧰	᧱	᧲	᧳	᧴	᧵	᧶	᧷	᧸	᧹	᧺	᧻	᧼	᧽	᧾	᧿
Notes 1.As of Unicode version 17.0

The symbols at U+19E0 and U+19F0 represent the first and second "eighth month" in a lunar year containing a leap-month (see Khmer calendar). The remaining symbols in this block denote the days of a lunar month: those in the U+19Ex series for waxing days, and those in the U+19Fx series for waning days.

== See also ==
- Khmer Braille
- Romanization of Khmer
- Khom Thai script
