= Khmer (Unicode block) =

- Range: U+1780..U+17FF (128 code points)
- Plane: BMP
- Scripts: Khmer
- Major alphabets: Khmer
- Assigned: 114 code points
- Unused: 14 reserved code points 2 deprecated

Unicode version history
- 3.0 (1999): 103 (+103)
- 4.0 (2003): 114 (+11)

Unicode documentation
- Code chart ∣ Web page

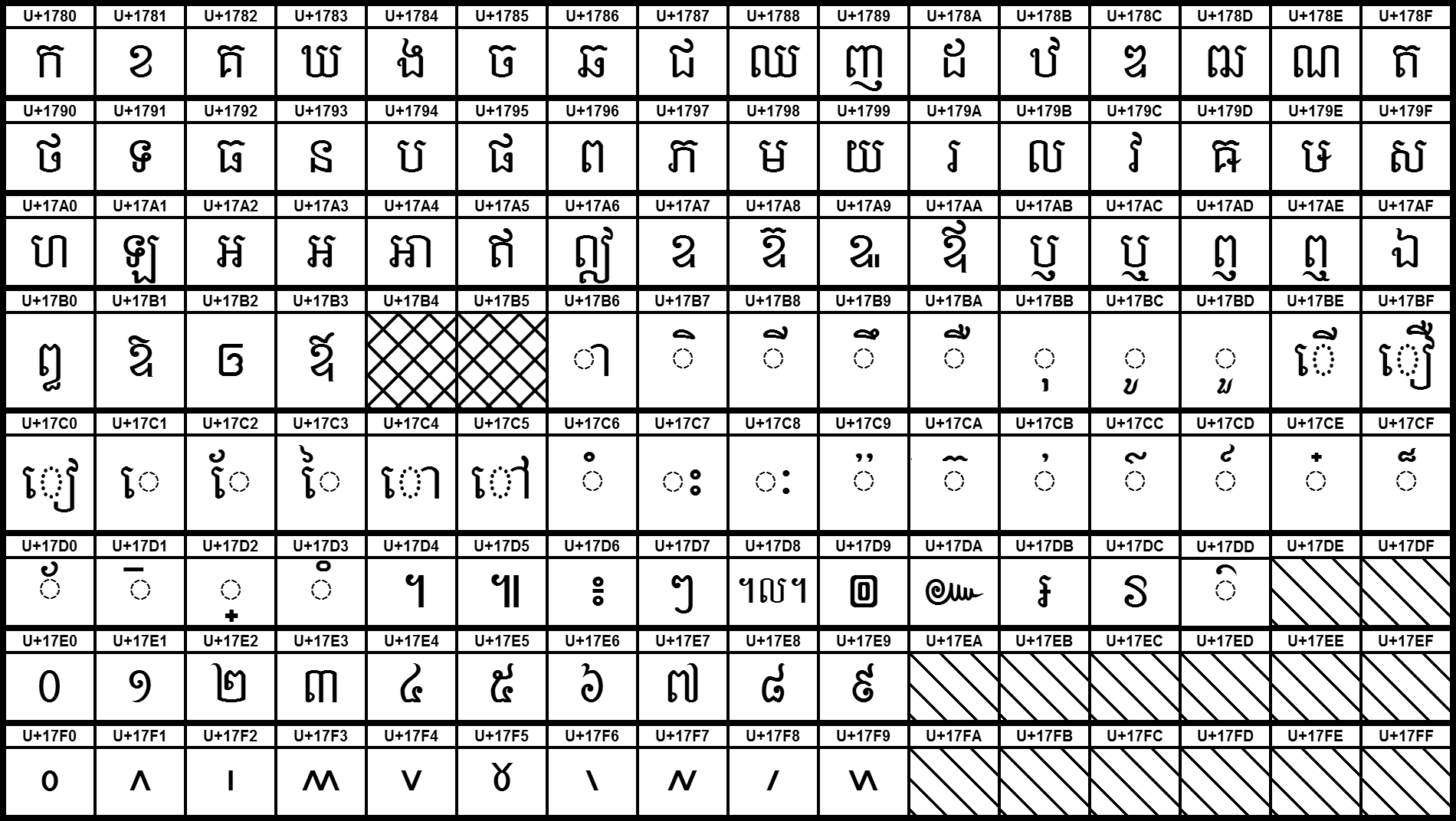
Graphical representation of the Khmer Unicode block

Khmer is a Unicode block containing characters for writing the Khmer (Cambodian) language. For details of the characters, see Khmer alphabet – Unicode.

== Block ==
Khmer^{[1]}^{[2]}^{[3]} Official Unicode Consortium code chart (PDF)
| | 0 | 1 | 2 | 3 | 4 | 5 | 6 | 7 | 8 | 9 | A | B | C | D | E | F |
| U+178x | ក | ខ | គ | ឃ | ង | ច | ឆ | ជ | ឈ | ញ | ដ | ឋ | ឌ | ឍ | ណ | ត |
| U+179x | ថ | ទ | ធ | ន | ប | ផ | ព | ភ | ម | យ | រ | ល | វ | ឝ | ឞ | ស |
| U+17Ax | ហ | ឡ | អ | ឣ | ឤ | ឥ | ឦ | ឧ | ឨ | ឩ | ឪ | ឫ | ឬ | ឭ | ឮ | ឯ |
| U+17Bx | ឰ | ឱ | ឲ | ឳ | KIV; AQ | KIV; AA | ា | ិ | ី | ឹ | ឺ | ុ | ូ | ួ | ើ | ឿ |
| U+17Cx | ៀ | េ | ែ | ៃ | ោ | ៅ | ំ | ះ | ៈ | ៉ | ៊ | ់ | ៌ | ៍ | ៎ | ៏ |
| U+17Dx | ័ | ៑ | ្ | ៓ | ។ | ៕ | ៖ | ៗ | ៘ | ៙ | ៚ | ៛ | ៜ | ៝ | | |
| U+17Ex | ០ | ១ | ២ | ៣ | ៤ | ៥ | ៦ | ៧ | ៨ | ៩ | | | | | | |
| U+17Fx | ៰ | ៱ | ៲ | ៳ | ៴ | ៵ | ៶ | ៷ | ៸ | ៹ | | | | | | |
Notes: 1. As of Unicode version 16.0; 2. Grey areas indicate non-assigned code points; 3. U+17A3 and U+17A4 are deprecated as of Unicode versions 4.0 and 5.2 respectively

== History ==
The following Unicode-related documents record the purpose and process of defining specific characters in the Khmer block:

| Version | Final code points (Note: Proposed code points and characters names may differ from final code points and names) | Count | L2 ID | WG2 ID | Document |
|---|---|---|---|---|---|
| 3.0 | U+1780..17DC, 17E0..17E9 | 103 | L2/97-040 | N1524 | Everson, Michael (1997-01-22), Proposal for encoding the Khmer script in ISO 10646 |
| 3.0 | U+1780..17DC, 17E0..17E9 | 103 | L2/97-194 | | Bauhahn, Maurice (1997-07-30), Proposal for Encoding of the Khmer Script |
| 3.0 | U+1780..17DC, 17E0..17E9 | 103 | L2/97-255R | | Aliprand, Joan (1997-12-03), "Khmer [L2/194]", Approved Minutes – UTC #73 & L2 #170 joint meeting, Palo Alto, CA – August 4-5, 1997 |
| 3.0 | U+1780..17DC, 17E0..17E9 | 103 | L2/98-039 | | Aliprand, Joan; Winkler, Arnold (1998-02-24), "3.A.2. Khmer", Preliminary Minutes - UTC #74 & L2 #171, Mountain View, CA - December 5, 1997 |
| 3.0 | U+1780..17DC, 17E0..17E9 | 103 | L2/98-101 | N1729 | Ad-hoc report on Burmese and Khmer, 1998-03-18 |
| 3.0 | U+1780..17DC, 17E0..17E9 | 103 | L2/98-175 | N1779 | Text for PDAM registration and consideration ballot for ISO 10646-1 Amendment 25 - Khmer, 1998-05-11 |
| 3.0 | U+1780..17DC, 17E0..17E9 | 103 | | N1825 | Paterson, Bruce (1998-05-11), PDAM25 - Khmer cover sheet |
| 3.0 | U+1780..17DC, 17E0..17E9 | 103 | | N1825.1 | Paterson, Bruce (1998-05-11), PDAM25 - Khmer full text |
| 3.0 | U+1780..17DC, 17E0..17E9 | 103 | L2/98-158 | | Aliprand, Joan; Winkler, Arnold (1998-05-26), "Khmer", Draft Minutes – UTC #76 & NCITS Subgroup L2 #173 joint meeting, Tredyffrin, Pennsylvania, April 20-22, 1998 |
| 3.0 | U+1780..17DC, 17E0..17E9 | 103 | L2/98-286 | N1703 | Umamaheswaran, V. S.; Ksar, Mike (1998-07-02), "8.17", Unconfirmed Meeting Minutes, WG 2 Meeting #34, Redmond, WA, USA; 1998-03-16--20 |
| 3.0 | U+1780..17DC, 17E0..17E9 | 103 | L2/98-359 | N1856 | Sato, T. K. (1998-08-21), Addition of Rial sign on ISO/IEC 10646-1 |
| 3.0 | U+1780..17DC, 17E0..17E9 | 103 | L2/98-324 | N1901 | ISO/IEC 10646-1/FPDAM 25, AMENDMENT 25: Khmer, 1998-10-23 |
| 3.0 | U+1780..17DC, 17E0..17E9 | 103 | L2/98-341 | | Disposition of comments report on SC2 N3105, ISO 10646 Amd. 25: Khmer, 1998-10-23 |
| 3.0 | U+1780..17DC, 17E0..17E9 | 103 | | N1911 | Paterson, Bruce; Everson, Michael (1998-10-23), Text of FPDAM 25 - Khmer - SC2 N3201 |
| 3.0 | U+1780..17DC, 17E0..17E9 | 103 | L2/99-010 | N1903 (pdf, html, doc) | Umamaheswaran, V. S. (1998-12-30), "6.7.8", Minutes of WG 2 meeting 35, London, U.K.; 1998-09-21--25 |
| 3.0 | U+1780..17DC, 17E0..17E9 | 103 | L2/99-128 | | Paterson, Bruce (1999-04-14), Text for FDAM ballot ISO/IEC 10646 FDAM #25 - Khmer |
| 3.0 | U+1780..17DC, 17E0..17E9 | 103 | L2/99-232 | N2003 | Umamaheswaran, V. S. (1999-08-03), "6.2.8 FPDAM25 – Khmer script", Minutes of WG 2 meeting 36, Fukuoka, Japan, 1999-03-09--15 |
| 3.0 | U+1780..17DC, 17E0..17E9 | 103 | L2/00-009 | N2149 | Sato, T. K. (2000-01-05), Khmer Up-Date |
| 3.0 | U+1780..17DC, 17E0..17E9 | 103 | L2/00-056 | N2164 | Sato, T. K. (2000-02-23), AMD-25 (Khmer) correction request |
| 3.0 | U+1780..17DC, 17E0..17E9 | 103 | L2/00-109 | | Suignard, Michel (2000-04-06), Corrections to Khmer character tables in 10646 and Unicode |
| 3.0 | U+1780..17DC, 17E0..17E9 | 103 | L2/00-234 | N2203 (rtf, txt) | Umamaheswaran, V. S. (2000-07-21), "8.1", Minutes from the SC2/WG2 meeting in Beijing, 2000-03-21 -- 24 |
| 3.0 | U+1780..17DC, 17E0..17E9 | 103 | L2/00-338 | N2274 | Working Draft of Tables & Character Names for Editorial correction to Khmer for 10646-1:2000, 2000-09-19 |
| 3.0 | U+1780..17DC, 17E0..17E9 | 103 | L2/01-307 | | Whistler, Ken (2001-08-06), Serious bug in Khmer, Myanmar combining classes |
| 3.0 | U+1780..17DC, 17E0..17E9 | 103 | L2/01-308 | | Hosken, Martin; Whistler, Ken (2001-08-08), Serious bug in Khmer, Myanmar combining classes |
| 3.0 | U+1780..17DC, 17E0..17E9 | 103 | L2/01-310 | | McGowan, Rick; Whistler, Ken (2001-08-12), Khmer issues on the Horizon |
| 3.0 | U+1780..17DC, 17E0..17E9 | 103 | L2/01-372 | N2380 | Cambodian official objection to the existing Khmer block in UCS, 2001-10-08 |
| 3.0 | U+1780..17DC, 17E0..17E9 | 103 | L2/01-382 | N2385 | Bauhahn, Maurice; Everson, Michael (2001-10-11), Response to Cambodian official objection to Khmer block (N2380) |
| 3.0 | U+1780..17DC, 17E0..17E9 | 103 | L2/01-421 | N2380R | Cambodian official objection to the existing Khmer block in UCS, 2001-10-14 |
| 3.0 | U+1780..17DC, 17E0..17E9 | 103 | L2/01-394 | | Phu, Leewood (2001-10-17), Letter from Cambodia to JTC 1 Chairman Regarding Khmer Character Encoding in ISO/IEC 10646 |
| 3.0 | U+1780..17DC, 17E0..17E9 | 103 | L2/01-443 | N2406 | Response to WG2 Document N2385, 2001-10-11, 2001-11-04 |
| 3.0 | U+1780..17DC, 17E0..17E9 | 103 | L2/01-476 | | Karlsson, Kent (2001-12-19), Ordering rules for Khmer |
| 3.0 | U+1780..17DC, 17E0..17E9 | 103 | L2/02-016 | | Whistler, Ken (2002-01-14), Character Properties for repetition marks |
| 3.0 | U+1780..17DC, 17E0..17E9 | 103 | L2/02-017 | | Whistler, Ken (2002-01-14), Character Properties for avagrahas, etc. |
| 3.0 | U+1780..17DC, 17E0..17E9 | 103 | L2/02-073 | | Davis, Mark (2002-02-08), Cambodian |
| 3.0 | U+1780..17DC, 17E0..17E9 | 103 | L2/02-097 | | Chea, Sok Huor; Lao, Kim Leang; Harada, Shiro; Klein, Norbert (2002-02-13), Proposal to deprecate Khmer characters |
| 3.0 | U+1780..17DC, 17E0..17E9 | 103 | L2/02-131 | N2412 | Everson, Michael (2002-03-31), On the suitability of the COENG encoding model for Khmer |
| 3.0 | U+1780..17DC, 17E0..17E9 | 103 | L2/02-154 | N2403 | Umamaheswaran, V. S. (2002-04-22), "5.1", Draft minutes of WG 2 meeting 41, Hotel Phoenix, Singapore, 2001-10-15/19 |
| 3.0 | U+1780..17DC, 17E0..17E9 | 103 | L2/02-196 | N2458 | Harada, Shiro (2002-05-03), On the Unsuitability of "COENG encoding model" for Khmer |
| 3.0 | U+1780..17DC, 17E0..17E9 | 103 | L2/02-211 | N2459 | Cambodian stance regarding Khmer code table in Unicode 3.2, 2002-05-14 |
| 3.0 | U+1780..17DC, 17E0..17E9 | 103 | | N2459R | Revised Cambodian stance regarding Khmer code table in Unicode, 2002-05-20 |
| 3.0 | U+1780..17DC, 17E0..17E9 | 103 | L2/02-166R2 | | Moore, Lisa (2002-08-09), "Consensus 91-C5", UTC #91 Minutes, "Leave the ROBAT as it is in the standard today (do not deprecate) and document its use appropriately." |
| 3.0 | U+1780..17DC, 17E0..17E9 | 103 | L2/02-070 | | Moore, Lisa (2002-08-26), "Consensus 90-C1, Consensus 90-C2, and Motion 90-M9", Minutes for UTC #90 |
| 3.0 | U+1780..17DC, 17E0..17E9 | 103 | L2/03-430 | | Davis, Mark (2003-11-10), Problem with Khmer / ZWJ / ZWNJ |
| 3.0 | U+1780..17DC, 17E0..17E9 | 103 | | N2956 | Freytag, Asmus (2005-08-12), "Representative glyphs for U+17D2 and U+10A3F", Unicode Consortium Liaison Report for WG2 Meeting #47 |
| 3.0 | U+1780..17DC, 17E0..17E9 | 103 | L2/05-180 | | Moore, Lisa (2005-08-17), "Consensus 104-C12", UTC #104 Minutes, "Change the representative glyphs for Kharoshthi U+10A3F and Khmer U+17D2 to be the same as U+17D2, but with both enclosed in a dashed box..." |
| 3.0 | U+1780..17DC, 17E0..17E9 | 103 | | N2953 (pdf, doc) | Umamaheswaran, V. S. (2006-02-16), "M47.16 (Miscellaneous glyph defects)", Unconfirmed minutes of WG 2 meeting 47, Sophia Antipolis, France; 2005-09-12/15 |
| 3.0 | U+1780..17DC, 17E0..17E9 | 103 | L2/08-287 | | Davis, Mark (2008-08-04), Public Review Issue #122: Proposal for Additional Deprecated Characters |
| 3.0 | U+1780..17DC, 17E0..17E9 | 103 | L2/08-253R2 | | Moore, Lisa (2008-08-19), "Consensus 116-C13", UTC #116 Minutes, "Change the deprecated property by removing 0340, 0341, 17D3, and adding 0149, 0F77, 0F79, 17A4, 2329, 232A." |
| 3.0 | U+1780..17DC, 17E0..17E9 | 103 | L2/08-328 (html, xls) | | Whistler, Ken (2008-10-14), Spreadsheet of Deprecation and Discouragement |
| 3.0 | U+1780..17DC, 17E0..17E9 | 103 | L2/09-234 | N3603 (pdf, doc) | Umamaheswaran, V. S. (2009-07-08), "M54.13h", Unconfirmed minutes of WG 2 meeting 54 |
| 3.0 | U+1780..17DC, 17E0..17E9 | 103 | L2/10-416R | | Moore, Lisa (2010-11-09), "Properties of Two Khmer Characters (B.10.3) [U+17B4 and U+17B5]", UTC #125 / L2 #222 Minutes |
| 4.0 | U+17DD, 17F0..17F9 | 11 | L2/02-083 | | Nelson, Paul (2001-12-02), Response and Proposal for Khmer Encoding |
| 4.0 | U+17DD, 17F0..17F9 | 11 | L2/02-100 | | Chea, Sok Huor; Lao, Kim Leang; Harada, Shiro; Klein, Norbert (2002-02-13), Proposal to add missing Khmer characters |
| 4.0 | U+17DD, 17F0..17F9 | 11 | L2/02-070 | | Moore, Lisa (2002-08-26), "Consensus 90-C23", Minutes for UTC #90 |
| 4.0 | U+17DD, 17F0..17F9 | 11 | L2/16-163 | | Pournader, Roozbeh (2015-05-12), Additions to Indic Syllabic Category for Myanmar and Khmer |
