= Glottal stop =

Sound made by stopping airflow in the glottis

ʔ
- IPA number: 113

Audio sample
- source · help

Encoding
- Entity (decimal): &#660;
- Unicode (hex): U+0294
- X-SAMPA: ?
- Braille: ⠆ (braille pattern dots-23)
Image

A glottal stop, glottal plosive, or glottal catch is a type of consonantal sound used in many spoken languages, produced by obstructing airflow in the vocal tract or, more precisely, the glottis. It is familiar to English speakers as the catch in the middle of "uh-oh". The symbol in the International Phonetic Alphabet that represents this sound is ⟨ʔ⟩.

As a result of the action of the glottis, glottal vibration either stops or becomes irregular with a low rate and sudden drop in intensity.

== Features ==
Features of a glottal stop:

- Its manner of articulation is occlusive, which means it is produced by obstructing airflow in the vocal tract. Since the airflow is blocked entirely, the consonant is a plosive.
- Its place of articulation is glottal, which means it is articulated at and by the vocal cords (vocal folds).
- It has no phonation at all, as there is no airflow through the glottis. Because of this, the typical oral–nasal dichotomy does not apply.
  - Glottal closure may be regarded as a phonation state, in which case the consonant is a segmental realization.
  - The consonant may still be regarded as "voiceless" in the sense that it is produced without any vibration of the vocal cords.
- Because the sound is not produced with airflow over the tongue, the median–lateral dichotomy does not apply.
- Its airstream mechanism is pulmonic, which means it is articulated by pushing air only with the intercostal muscles and abdominal muscles, as in most speech sounds.

== Occurrence ==
The table below demonstrates how widely glottal stops are found among the world's spoken languages:

Language		Word	IPA	Meaning	Notes
Abkhaz		аи/ai	[ʔaj]	'no'	See Abkhaz phonology.
Adyghe		Ӏэ/'ė	[ʔa]	'arm/hand'	
Arabic	Modern Standard	أغاني/ʾaḡānī	[ʔaˈɣaːniː]	'songs'	See Arabic phonology, Hamza.
Arabic	Levantine and Egyptian	شقة/ša''a	[ˈʃæʔʔæ]	'apartment'	Corresponds to /q/ or /g/ in other dialects. See Levantine Arabic phonology and Egyptian Arabic phonology
Arabic	Fasi and Tlemcenian	قال/'āl	[ˈʔaːl]	'he said'	Corresponds to /q/ or /g/ in other dialects.
Bantawa		चा:वा	[t͡saʔwa]	'drinking water'	
Bikol		bàgo	[ˈbaːʔɡo]	'new'	
Blackfoot		ᓭᖰ / sa’áí	[saʔɛ́]	'duck'	
Bulgarian		ъ-ъ/ŭ-ŭ	[ˈʔɤʔɤ]	'nope'	
Burmese		မြစ်များ/mrac mya:	[mjiʔ mjá]	'rivers'	
Cacua		maʔ	[mà̜ʔ˭]	'water'	
Cebuano		gatuo	[ˈgatuʔo]	'believe'	
Chamorro		haluʼu	[həluʔu]	'shark'	
Chinese	Mandarin Chinese	西安/xi an	[ɕi˥ ʔän˥]	'Xi An'	See Standard Chinese phonology.
Chinese	Cantonese	愛/oi3	[ʔɔːi˧]	'love'	See Cantonese phonology.
Chinese	Wu	一级了/ih cih leh	[ʔiɪʔ.tɕiɪʔ.ʔləʔ]	'superb'	
Chinese	Hokkien	合/ha̍h	[haʔ˨˦]	'to suit'	
Cook Islands Māori		taʻi	[taʔi]	'one'	
Czech		naopak	[naʔopak]	'the other way around'	See Czech phonology.
Dahalo		maʼa	[maʔa]	'water'	see Dahalo phonology
Danish		hånd	[ˈhʌ̹nʔ]	'hand'	One of the possible realizations of stød. Depending on the dialect and style of speech, it can be instead realized as laryngealisation of the preceding sound. See Danish phonology.
Dutch		beamen	[bəʔˈaːmə(n)]	'to confirm'	See Dutch phonology.
English	Multiple dialects	I am	[ʔaɪ ʔæm] (emphatic "am")) or [ʔaɪ æm]	'I'	Glottal stop before initial vowel at the start of a phrase. Elsewhere, optionally, to emphasize a word or separate it from the previous one.
English	Australian	cat	[kʰæʔ(t)]	'cat'	Allophone of /t/, /k/ or /p/. See glottalization, English phonology, and definite article reduction.
English	Estuary	cat	[kʰæʔ]	'cat'	Allophone of /t/, /k/ or /p/. See glottalization, English phonology, and definite article reduction.
English	Cockney	cat	[kʰɛ̝ʔ]	'cat'	Allophone of /t/, /k/ or /p/. See glottalization, English phonology, and definite article reduction.
English	Scottish	cat	[kʰäʔ]	'cat'	Allophone of /t/, /k/ or /p/. See glottalization, English phonology, and definite article reduction.
English	Some Northern England	the	[ʔ]	'the'	Allophone of /t/, /k/ or /p/. See glottalization, English phonology, and definite article reduction.
English	Geordie	people		'people'	Allophone of /t/, /k/ or /p/. See glottalization, English phonology, and definite article reduction.
English	Received Pronunciation	button	[ˈbɐʔn̩]	'button'	Allophone of /t/, /k/ or /p/. See glottalization, English phonology, and definite article reduction.
English	General American	button	[ˈbɐʔn̩]	'button'	Allophone of /t/, /k/ or /p/. See glottalization, English phonology, and definite article reduction.
German	Northern	Beamter	[bəˈʔamtɐ]	'civil servant'	Generally all vowel onsets. See Standard German phonology.
Hmong		𖬒𖬰𖬮𖬰 / ob	[ʔo˦]	'two (2)'	
Guaraní		avañeʼẽ	[ãʋ̃ãɲẽˈʔẽ]	'Guaraní'	Occurs only between vowels.
Hawaiian		ʻeleʻele	[ˈʔɛlɛˈʔɛlɛ]	'black'	See Hawaiian phonology.
Hebrew		מַאֲמָר/ma'amar	[maʔămaʁ]	'article'	Often elided in casual speech. See Modern Hebrew phonology.
Icelandic		en	[ʔɛn]	'but'	Only used according to emphasis, never occurring in minimal pairs.
Iloko		nalab-ay	[nalabˈʔaj]	'bland tasting'	Hyphen when occurring within the word.
Indonesian		bakso	[ˌbäʔˈso]	'meatball'	Allophone of /k/ or /ɡ/ in the syllable coda.
Ingush		кхоъ / qoʼ	[qoʔ]	'three'	
Japanese	Kagoshima	首 / kuQ	[kuʔ]	'neck'	
Javanese		ꦲꦤꦏ꧀	[änäʔ]	'child'	Allophone of /k/ in morpheme-final position.
Jedek			[wɛ̃ʔ]	'left side'	
Kabardian		Ӏэ/'ė	[ʔa]	'arm/hand'	
Kagayanen		saag	[saˈʔaɡ]	'floor'	
Khasi		lyoh	[lʔɔːʔ]	'cloud'	
Khmer		សំអាត / sâmqat	[sɑmʔaːt]	'to clean'	See Khmer phonology
Korean		일/il	[ʔil]	'one'	In free variation with no glottal stop. Occurs only in initial position of a word.
Malay	Standard	tidak	[ˈtidäʔ]	'no'	Allophone of final /k/ in the syllable coda, pronounced before consonants and at end of the a word. In other positions, /ʔ/ has phonemic status only in loanwords from Arabic. See Malay phonology
Malay	Kelantan-Pattani	ikat	[ˌiˈkaʔ]	'to tie'	Allophone of final /p, t, k/ in the syllable coda. Pronounced before consonants and at the end of a word.
Malay	Terengganu	ikat	[ˌiˈkaʔ]	'to tie'	Allophone of final /p, t, k/ in the syllable coda. Pronounced before consonants and at the end of a word.
Malay	Sarawak	ajak	[ad͡ʒaʔ]	'only'	Phonemically distinct from [k], with minimal pairs such as [ad͡ʒaʔ] 'only' and [ad͡ʒak̚] 'to invite'. See Sarawak Malay
Makassarese		taʼdoʼdoʼ	[ˌt̪ʰaʔˈɗɔʔɗɔʔ]	'be exhausted'	Written as takdokdok, taddoddok, taʼdoddoʼ, taqdoqdoq or taddoddoʼ in other orthography.
Maltese		qattus	[ˈʔattus]	'cat'	
Māori	Taranaki, Whanganui	wahine	[waʔinɛ]	'woman'	
Minangkabau		waʼang	[wäʔäŋ]	'you'	Sometimes written without an apostrophe.
Mutsun		tawkaʼli	[tawkaʔli]	'Ribes divaricatum'	
Mingrelian		ჸოროფა/?oropha	[ʔɔrɔpʰɑ]	'love'	
Nahuatl		tahtli	[taʔtɬi]	'father'	Often left unwritten.
Nez Perce		yáakaʔ	[ˈjaːkaʔ]	'black bear'	
Nheengatu		ai	[aˈʔi]	'sloth'	Transcription (or absence thereof) varies.
Nuxalk		nts	[ʔnt͡s]	'I, me'	
Ojibwe		ᒪᓯᓇᐃᑲᓐ/mazina'igan	[ˌmʌzɪˌnʌʔɪˈɡʌn]	'book', 'paper'	Merges with /h/ in some dialects. See Ojibwe phonology.
Okinawan		音/utu	[ʔutu]	'sound'	
Persian		معنی/ma'ni	[maʔni]	'meaning'	See Persian phonology.
Polish		era	[ʔɛra]	'era'	Most often occurs as an anlaut of an initial vowel (Ala ‒> [Ɂala]). See Polish phonology#Glottal stop.
Pirahã		baíxi	[ˈmàí̯ʔì]	'parent'	
Portuguese	Vernacular Brazilian	ê-ê	[ˌʔe̞ˈʔeː]	'yeah right'	Marginal sound. Does not occur after or before a consonant. In Brazilian casual speech, there is at least one [ʔ]–vowel length–pitch accent minimal pair (triply unusual, the ideophones short ih vs. long ih). See Portuguese phonology.
Portuguese	Some speakers	à aula	[ˈa ˈʔawlɐ]	'to the class'	Marginal sound. Does not occur after or before a consonant. In Brazilian casual speech, there is at least one [ʔ]–vowel length–pitch accent minimal pair (triply unusual, the ideophones short ih vs. long ih). See Portuguese phonology.
Rotuman		ʻusu	[ʔusu]	'to box'	
Russian		не-а / ne-a	[ˈnʲeʔə]	'nope'	
Samoan		maʻi	[maʔi]	'sickness/illness'	
Sardinian	Some dialects of Barbagia	unu pacu	[ˈuːnu paʔu]	'a little'	Intervocalic allophone of /n, k, l/.
Sardinian	Some dialects of Sarrabus	sa luna	[sa ʔuʔa]	'the moon'	Intervocalic allophone of /n, k, l/.
Serbo-Croatian		i onda	[iː ʔô̞n̪d̪a̠]	'and then'	Optionally inserted between vowels across word boundaries. See Serbo-Croatian phonology
Seri		he	[ʔɛ]	'I'	
Somali		baʼ	[baʔ]	'calamity'	though /ʔ/ occurs before all vowels, it is only written medially and finally. See Somali phonology
Spanish	Nicaraguan	más alto	[ˈma ˈʔal̻t̻o̞]	'higher'	Marginal sound or allophone of /s/ between vowels in different words. Does not occur after or before a consonant. See Spanish phonology.
Spanish	Yucateco	cuatro años	[ˈkwatɾo̞ ˈʔãɲo̞s]	'four years'	Marginal sound or allophone of /s/ between vowels in different words. Does not occur after or before a consonant. See Spanish phonology.
Squamish		Sḵwx̱wú7mesh sníchim	[sqʷχʷoʔməʃ]	'Squamish language'	
Tagalog		aaâ	[ʔɐʔɐˈʔaʔ]	'to poo' (fut.)	See Tagalog phonology.
Tahitian		puaʻa	[puaʔa]	'pig'	
Thai		อา/'ā	[ʔaː]	'uncle/aunt' (father's younger sibling)	
Tongan		tuʻu	[tuʔu]	'stand'	
Tundra Nenets		выʼ/vy'	[wɨʔ]	'tundra'	
Vietnamese		oi	[ʔɔj˧]	'sultry'	In free variation with no glottal stop. See Vietnamese phonology.
Võro		piniq	[ˈpinʲiʔ]	'dogs'	"q" is Võro plural marker (maa, kala, "land", "fish"; maaq, kalaq, "lands", "fishes").
Wagiman		jamh	[t̠ʲʌmʔ]	'to eat' (perf.)	
Welayta		7írTi	[ʔirʈa]	'wet'	
Wallisian		maʻuli	[maʔuli]	'life'	

=== Intervocalic position ===
In many languages that do not allow a sequence of vowels (such as Persian), a glottal stop may be used epenthetically to prevent such a hiatus. There are intricate interactions between falling tone and the glottal stop in the histories of such languages as Danish (see stød), Cantonese and Thai.

In many languages, the unstressed intervocalic allophone of the glottal stop is a creaky-voiced glottal approximant. It is known to be contrastive in only one language, Gimi, in which it is the voiced equivalent of the stop.

=== Secondary articulation ===
Some languages have glottal stops with secondary articulation (approximant-like release). It has been noted that palatalized and labialized glottal stops, respectively /ʔʲ/ and /ʔʷ/, are quite similar to the glottalized sonorants /ˀj/ and /ˀw/, and either case may be analyzed instead as sequences, /ʔj/ and /ʔw/; the specific interpretation of these sounds is mostly dependent upon how they pattern with other sounds within a particular language's phonological structure.

Most languages that have secondarily articulated glottal stops have only one of either a palatalized or labialized variant, often in contrast with a plain glottal stop. However, the Abzakh dialect of Adyghe, a Northwest Caucasian language, Cicipu and Vadi, two Benue–Congo languages of the Kambari branch, and Bolyu, an Austroasiatic language, have all been reported to have a three-way contrast between plain, palatalized, and labialized glottal stops.

Some varieties of Arabic, such as Aleppo and Shihhi, have an allophonic pharyngealized glottal stop [ʔˤ], typically classed as an emphatic consonant. This sound is also found as an allophone in Chechen, a Northeast Caucasian language. As with the ambiguity noted in the examples above, several Salishan languages have a very similar phoneme analyzed instead as a glottalized pharyngeal approximant /ˀʕ̞/.

=== Nasalization ===
A few languages (such as Ganza and Tomo-Kan Dogon) have been reported to contain nasalized glottal stops /ʔ̃/ that contrast with non-nasal ones in their phonemic inventories, and a few other languages (such as Kaingang and Standard Thai) have been reported to contain them as allophones in certain environments. While they are all commonly called nasal(ized) glottal stops, the phonological implications of such sounds vary, typically occurring as one of the following:

- Inducing nasalization on surrounding vowels, where their non-nasal counterparts do not (such as /Vʔ̃V/ → [Ṽʔ̃Ṽ]).
- Nasalizing as a result of adjacency to nasal vowels (such as /ṼʔṼ/ → [Ṽʔ̃Ṽ]).
- Exhibiting prenasalization or nasal release (such as [ⁿʔ] or [ʔⁿ]).

Similar features have been reported with the nature of creaky-voiced glottal approximants and their spread of creaky-voice to surrounding vowels or presence of pre-/post-creak.

However, the phonetic status of truly "nasalized" glottal stops is debated, depending on one's definition of nasality; similarly, although they may be contrastive in their underlying forms, a perceptual difference in their surface realizations is doubted. Some linguists have argued that because nasal airflow and glottal closure are mutually exclusive features, phonetic nasalized glottal stops are impossible entities. Other linguists have argued that because the gestural lowering of the velum (opening of the velopharyngeal port) that is associated with nasality is entirely compatible with glottal closure, they are not only possible but expected in some environments, particularly those where nasal harmony is not blocked by the presence of a glottal stop (such as in Sundanese, Acehnese, and Warao). Thus, the recognition of nasalized glottal stops as a phonetic possibility is a matter of whether nasality is defined as the presence of nasal airflow or by the exhibition of a lowered velum.

=== In English ===
==== Replacement of /t/ ====
In English, the glottal stop occurs as an open juncture (for example, between the vowel sounds in uh-oh!) and allophonically in t-glottalization. In British English, the glottal stop is most familiar in the Cockney pronunciation of "butter" as "bu'er". Geordie English often uses glottal stops for /p, t, k/, and has a unique form of glottalization. Additionally, there is the glottal stop as a null onset for English; in other words, it is the non-phonemic glottal stop occurring before isolated or initial vowels.

Often a glottal stop happens at the beginning of vowel phonation after a silence.

Although this segment is not a phoneme in English, it occurs phonetically in nearly all dialects of English, as an allophone of /t/ in the syllable coda. Speakers of Cockney, Scottish English and several other British dialects also pronounce an intervocalic /t/ between vowels as in city. In Received Pronunciation, a glottal stop is inserted before a tautosyllabic voiceless stop: sto'p, tha't, kno'ck, wa'tch, lea'p, soa'k, hel'p, pin'ch.

In American English, /t/ is usually not aspirated in syllables ending either in /Vt/ (where /V/ is a vowel), such as "cat" or "outside"; or in an unstressed /tVn/ segment, such as "mountain" or "Manhattan". This is an unreleased stop [t̚], colloquially referred to as a "held t", as the airflow is stopped by tongue at the ridge behind the teeth. However, there is a trend of younger speakers in the Mid-Atlantic states to replace the "held t" with a glottal stop, so that "Manhattan" sounds like "Man-ha'in" or "Clinton" like "Cli(n)'in", where ⟨'⟩ is the glottal stop. This may have crossed over from African American Vernacular English, particularly that of New York City.

==== Before initial vowels ====
Most English speakers today often use a glottal stop before the initial vowel of words beginning with a vowel, particularly at the beginning of sentences or phrases or when a word is emphasized. This is also known as "hard attack". Traditionally in Received Pronunciation, "hard attack" was seen as a way to emphasize a word. Today, in British, American and other varieties of English, it is increasingly used not only to emphasize but also simply to separate two words, especially when the first word ends in a glottal stop.

==== In alliteration ====
In English poetry, the ability for any initial vowel to alliterate with any other may be attributed to the presence of glottal stops.

== Orthography ==
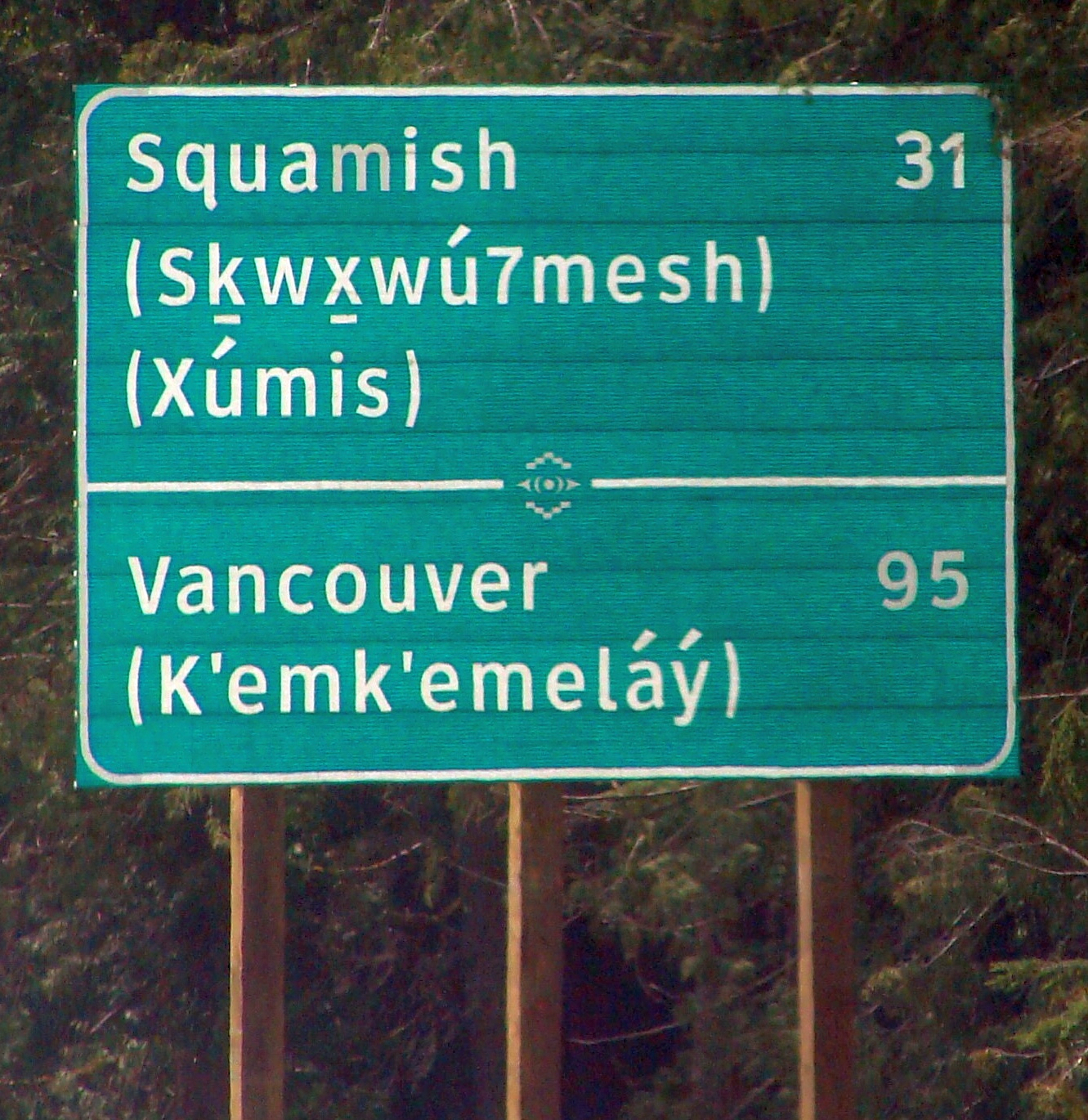
Road sign in British Columbia showing the use of the digit ⟨7⟩ to represent /ʔ/ in Squamish.

In the traditional romanization of many languages, such as Arabic, a glottal stop is transcribed with the apostrophe ⟨ʼ⟩ or the symbol ⟨ʾ⟩, which is the source of the IPA character ⟨ʔ⟩. In many Polynesian languages that use the Latin alphabet, however, the glottal stop is written with a rotated apostrophe, ⟨ʻ⟩ (called ʻokina in Hawaiian and Samoan), which is commonly used to transcribe the Arabic ayin as well (also ⟨ʽ⟩) and is the source of the IPA character for the voiced pharyngeal fricative ⟨ʕ⟩. In Malay the glottal stop is represented by the letter ⟨k⟩ (at the end of words), in Võro and Maltese by ⟨q⟩. Another way of writing the glottal stop is the saltillo ⟨Ꞌ ꞌ⟩, used in languages such as Tlapanec and Rapa Nui.

Other scripts also have letters used for representing glottal stops, such as the Hebrew letter aleph ⟨א⟩ and the Cyrillic letter palochka ⟨Ӏ⟩, used in several Caucasian languages. The Arabic script uses hamza ⟨ء⟩, which can appear both as a diacritic and as an independent letter (though not part of the alphabet). In Tundra Nenets, it is represented by the letters apostrophe ⟨ʼ⟩ and double apostrophe ⟨ˮ⟩. In Japanese, glottal stops occur at the end of interjections of surprise or anger and are represented by the character ⟨っ⟩.

In the graphic representation of most Philippine languages, glottal stops have no consistent symbolization. In most cases, however, a word that begins with a vowel-letter (e.g. Tagalog aso, "dog") is always pronounced with an unrepresented glottal stop before that vowel (as in Modern German and Hausa). Some orthographies use a hyphen instead of the reverse apostrophe if the glottal stop occurs in the middle of the word (e.g. Tagalog pag-ibig, "love"; or Visayan gabi-i, "night"). If it occurs in the end of a word, the last vowel can be written with a circumflex accent (known as the pakupyâ) if both a stress and a glottal stop occur in the final vowel (e.g. basâ, "wet") or a grave accent (known as the paiwà) if the glottal stop occurs at the final vowel, but the stress occurs at the penultimate syllable (e.g. batà, "child").

Some Canadian indigenous languages, especially some of the Salishan languages, have adopted the IPA letter ⟨ʔ⟩ into their orthographies. In some of them, it occurs as a casing pair, ⟨Ɂ⟩ and ⟨ɂ⟩. The digit ⟨7⟩ or a question mark is sometimes substituted for ⟨ʔ⟩, and is preferred in languages such as Squamish. SENĆOŦEN – whose alphabet is mostly unique from other Salish languages – contrastly uses the comma ⟨,⟩ to represent the glottal stop, though it is optional.

In 2015, two women in the Northwest Territories challenged the territorial government over its refusal to permit them to use the letter ⟨ʔ⟩ in their daughters' names: Sahaiʔa, a Chipewyan name, and Sakaeʔah, a Slavey name (the two names are actually cognates). The territory argued that territorial and federal identity documents were unable to accommodate the character. The women registered the names with hyphens instead of the ⟨ʔ⟩, while continuing to challenge the policy.

In the Crow language, the glottal stop is written as a question mark ⟨?⟩. The only instance of the glottal stop in Crow is as a question marker morpheme at the end of a sentence.

Use of the glottal stop is a distinct characteristic of the Southern Mainland Argyll dialects of Scottish Gaelic. In such a dialect, the standard Gaelic phrase Tha Gàidhlig agam ("I speak Gaelic"), would be rendered Tha Gàidhlig a'am.

In the Nawdm language of Ghana, the glottal stop is written ɦ, capital Ĥ.

In Devanagari some use the visarga like Bantawa, while Limbu uses a separate letter ⟨ॽ⟩.

== See also ==
- Saltillo
- Index of phonetics articles
- Hamza
- Voiced pharyngeal fricative
- Creaky-voiced glottal approximant
- Aleph

== Bibliography ==
- Blevins, Juliette (1994), "The Bimoraic Foot in Rotuman Phonology and Morphology", Oceanic Linguistics, 33 (2): 491–516, doi:10.2307/3623138, JSTOR 3623138
- Botma, E.D. (2004), "6: Nasalized laryngeals" (PDF), Phonological aspects of nasality: An element-based dependency approach (PhD), Utrecht: Universiteit van Amsterdam [LOT], pp. 279–306, hdl:11245/1.220655, ISBN 9789076864549
- Clark, John Ellery; Yallop, Colin; Fletcher, Janet (2007), An Introduction to Phonetics and Phonology, Wiley-Blackwell, ISBN 978-1-4051-3083-7, archived from the original on 2016-06-10
- Gussenhoven, Carlos (1992), "Dutch", Journal of the International Phonetic Association, 22 (2): 45–47, doi:10.1017/S002510030000459X, S2CID 243772965
- Ladefoged, Peter (2005), Vowels and Consonants (Second ed.), Blackwell, ISBN 0-631-21411-9
- Landau, Ernestina; Lončarić, Mijo; Horga, Damir; Škarić, Ivo (1999), "Croatian", Handbook of the International Phonetic Association: A guide to the use of the International Phonetic Alphabet, Cambridge: Cambridge University Press, pp. 66–69, ISBN 0-521-65236-7
- Olson, Kenneth; Mielke, Jeff; Sanicas-Daguman, Josephine; Pebley, Carol Jean; Paterson, Hugh J. III (2010), "The Phonetic Status of The (Inter)dental Approximant" (PDF), Journal of the International Phonetic Association, 40 (2): 199–215, doi:10.1017/S0025100309990296, S2CID 38504322, archived (PDF) from the original on 2019-12-16
- Piggott, G. L. (1992), "Variability in Feature Dependency: The Case of Nasality", Natural Language & Linguistic Theory, 10 (1): 33–77, JSTOR 4047766
- Roach, Peter (2004), "British English: Received Pronunciation", Journal of the International Phonetic Association, 34 (2): 239–245, doi:10.1017/S0025100304001768
- Schane, Sanford A. (1968), French Phonology and Morphology, Boston, Mass.: M.I.T. Press, ISBN 0-262-19040-0
- Sivertsen, Eva (1960), Cockney Phonology, Oslo: University of Oslo
- Thelwall, Robin (1990), "Illustrations of the IPA: Arabic", Journal of the International Phonetic Association, 20 (2): 37–41, doi:10.1017/S0025100300004266, S2CID 243640727
- Thompson, Laurence (1959), "Saigon phonemics", Language, 35 (3): 454–476, doi:10.2307/411232, JSTOR 411232
- Walker, Rachel; Pullum, Geoffrey K. (1999), "Short Report: Possible and Impossible Segments", Language, 75 (4): 764–780, doi:10.2307/417733, JSTOR 417733
- Watson, Janet (2002), The Phonology and Morphology of Arabic, New York: Oxford University Press, ISBN 0-19-824137-2

Place →	Labial					Coronal										Dorsal					Laryngeal			
Manner ↓	Bilabial		Labiodental		Linguolabial		Dental		Alveolar		Postalveolar		Retroflex		(Alveolo-)palatal		Velar		Uvular		Pharyngeal/epiglottal		Glottal	
Nasal	m̥	m	ɱ̊	ɱ		n̼	n̪̊	n̪	n̥	n	n̠̊	n̠	ɳ̊	ɳ	ɲ̊	ɲ	ŋ̊	ŋ	ɴ̥	ɴ				
Plosive	p	b	p̪	b̪	t̼	d̼	t̪	d̪	t	d			ʈ	ɖ	c	ɟ	k	ɡ	q	ɢ	ʡ		ʔ	
Sibilant affricate							t̪s̪	d̪z̪	ts	dz	t̠ʃ	d̠ʒ	tʂ	dʐ	tɕ	dʑ								
Non-sibilant affricate	pɸ	bβ	p̪f	b̪v			t̪θ	d̪ð	tɹ̝̊	dɹ̝	t̠ɹ̠̊˔	d̠ɹ̠˔			cç	ɟʝ	kx	ɡɣ	qχ	ɢʁ	ʡʜ	ʡʢ	ʔh	
Sibilant fricative							s̪	z̪	s	z	ʃ	ʒ	ʂ	ʐ	ɕ	ʑ								
Non-sibilant fricative	ɸ	β	f	v	θ̼	ð̼	θ	ð	θ̠	ð̠	ɹ̠̊˔	ɹ̠˔	ɻ̊˔	ɻ˔	ç	ʝ	x	ɣ	χ	ʁ	ħ	ʕ	h	ɦ
Approximant		β̞		ʋ				ð̞		ɹ		ɹ̠		ɻ		j		ɰ						˷
Tap/flap		ⱱ̟		ⱱ					ɾ̥	ɾ			ɽ̊	ɽ						ɢ̆		ʡ̆		
Trill	ʙ̥	ʙ							r̥	r		r̠	ɽ̊r̥	ɽr					ʀ̥	ʀ	ʜ	ʢ		
Lateral affricate									tɬ	dɮ			tꞎ	d𝼅	c𝼆	ɟʎ̝	k𝼄	ɡʟ̝						
Lateral fricative							ɬ̪		ɬ	ɮ			ꞎ	𝼅	𝼆	ʎ̝	𝼄	ʟ̝						
Lateral approximant								l̪	l̥	l		l̠	ɭ̊	ɭ	ʎ̥	ʎ	ʟ̥	ʟ		ʟ̠				
Lateral tap/flap									ɺ̥	ɺ			𝼈̊	𝼈		ʎ̆		ʟ̆						

		BL	LD	D	A	PA	RF	P	V	U
Implosive	Voiced	ɓ			ɗ		ᶑ	ʄ	ɠ	ʛ
Implosive	Voiceless	ɓ̥			ɗ̥		ᶑ̊	ʄ̊	ɠ̊	ʛ̥
Ejective	Stop	pʼ			tʼ		ʈʼ	cʼ	kʼ	qʼ
Ejective	Affricate		p̪fʼ	tθʼ	tsʼ	tʃʼ	tʂʼ	tɕʼ	kxʼ	qχʼ
Ejective	Fricative	ɸʼ	fʼ	θʼ	sʼ	ʃʼ	ʂʼ	ɕʼ	xʼ	χʼ
Ejective	Lateral affricate				tɬʼ			c𝼆ʼ	k𝼄ʼ	q𝼄ʼ
Ejective	Lateral fricative				ɬʼ					
Click (top: velar; bottom: uvular)	Tenuis	kʘ qʘ		kǀ qǀ	kǃ qǃ		k𝼊 q𝼊	kǂ qǂ		
Click (top: velar; bottom: uvular)	Voiced	ɡʘ ɢʘ		ɡǀ ɢǀ	ɡǃ ɢǃ		ɡ𝼊 ɢ𝼊	ɡǂ ɢǂ		
Click (top: velar; bottom: uvular)	Nasal	ŋʘ ɴʘ		ŋǀ ɴǀ	ŋǃ ɴǃ		ŋ𝼊 ɴ𝼊	ŋǂ ɴǂ	ʞ	
Click (top: velar; bottom: uvular)	Tenuis lateral				kǁ qǁ					
Click (top: velar; bottom: uvular)	Voiced lateral				ɡǁ ɢǁ					
Click (top: velar; bottom: uvular)	Nasal lateral				ŋǁ ɴǁ					
