= Creaky-voiced glottal approximant =

Consonantal sound

˷

Audio sample
- source · help

A creaky-voiced glottal approximant is a consonant sound in some languages. It involves tension in the glottis and diminution of airflow, compared to surrounding vowels, but not full occlusion. It is a common phonetic realization of a glottal stop, especially intervocalically, but is only rarely contrastive except when gemination is involved.

There is no symbol in the International Phonetic Alphabet dedicated for this sound, but the extIPA pre-/post-creak diacritic ⟨˷⟩ can be used. One source has used the transcription ⟨ʔ̬⟩, and another has used ⟨ʔ̰⟩; however, neither of the articulations described by these transcriptions are physically possible, (Note: Just as modal voice and creaky voice are phonation states, so too is a glottal stop [ʔ]; by definition, the glottis is closed, blocking the airstream and preventing any occurrence of voicing. Similarly, the glottal fricatives [h] and [ɦ] are frequently analyzed as segmental realizations of phonation states – voiceless aspiration and breathy voice – and lacking a place of articulation other than the glottis, as shown for example in Garellek et al. (2023); see Phonation § Glottal consonants. Adding a creaky-voice diacritic to any of these symbols would imply contradicting laryngeal settings.) and both sources quote Ladefoged & Maddieson (1996), who use the (ext)IPA wildcard ⟨*⟩ in their transcription.

== Features ==
Features of a creaky-voiced glottal approximant:

- Its manner of articulation is approximant, which means it is produced by narrowing the vocal tract at the place of articulation, but not enough to produce a turbulent airstream.
- Its phonation is creaky-voiced.
- It is an oral consonant, which means that air is not allowed to escape through the nose.
- Because the sound is not produced with airflow over the tongue, the median–lateral dichotomy does not apply.
- Its airstream mechanism is pulmonic, which means it is articulated by pushing air only with the intercostal muscles and abdominal muscles, as in most speech sounds.

== Occurrence ==
It is an intervocalic allophone of a glottal stop in many languages; in languages with gemination, it may only be a stop intervocalically when geminate.

Language	Word	IPA	Meaning	Notes
Gimi	hagok	[ha˷oʔ]	'many'	The voiced equivalent of a glottal stop /ʔ/; /˷/ and /ʔ/ correspond to /ɡ/ and /k/ in neighboring languages. One source analyses the pair instead as /ʔ/ and /ʔː/.
Koreguaje	u’chape’e	[út͡ʃàpè˷é]	'oil'	Non-contrastive allophone of /ʔ/.
Siona	maʼa	[ma̰a̰]	'path'	Allophone of /ʔ/ typically realized as creak on surrounding vowels.

== Bibliography ==
- Garellek, Marc; Chai, Yuan; Huang, Yaqian; Van Doren, Maxine (2023). "Voicing of glottal consonants and non-modal vowels". Journal of the International Phonetic Association. 53 (2): 305–332. doi:10.1017/S0025100321000116.
- Kehrein, Wolfgang; Golston, Chris (2005). "A prosodic theory of laryngeal contrasts". Phonology. 21 (3): 325–357. doi:10.1017/S0952675704000302. JSTOR 4615515. S2CID 62734231.
- Ladefoged, Peter; Maddieson, Ian (1996). The Sounds of the World's Languages. Oxford: Blackwell. ISBN 0-631-19815-6.
- Laver, John (1994). Principles of Phonetics. Cambridge University Press. doi:10.1017/CBO9781139166621. ISBN 0-521-45655-X.

Place →	Labial					Coronal										Dorsal					Laryngeal			
Manner ↓	Bilabial		Labiodental		Linguolabial		Dental		Alveolar		Postalveolar		Retroflex		(Alveolo-)palatal		Velar		Uvular		Pharyngeal/epiglottal		Glottal	
Nasal	m̥	m	ɱ̊	ɱ		n̼	n̪̊	n̪	n̥	n	n̠̊	n̠	ɳ̊	ɳ	ɲ̊	ɲ	ŋ̊	ŋ	ɴ̥	ɴ				
Plosive	p	b	p̪	b̪	t̼	d̼	t̪	d̪	t	d			ʈ	ɖ	c	ɟ	k	ɡ	q	ɢ	ʡ		ʔ	
Sibilant affricate							t̪s̪	d̪z̪	ts	dz	t̠ʃ	d̠ʒ	tʂ	dʐ	tɕ	dʑ								
Non-sibilant affricate	pɸ	bβ	p̪f	b̪v			t̪θ	d̪ð	tɹ̝̊	dɹ̝	t̠ɹ̠̊˔	d̠ɹ̠˔			cç	ɟʝ	kx	ɡɣ	qχ	ɢʁ	ʡʜ	ʡʢ	ʔh	
Sibilant fricative							s̪	z̪	s	z	ʃ	ʒ	ʂ	ʐ	ɕ	ʑ								
Non-sibilant fricative	ɸ	β	f	v	θ̼	ð̼	θ	ð	θ̠	ð̠	ɹ̠̊˔	ɹ̠˔	ɻ̊˔	ɻ˔	ç	ʝ	x	ɣ	χ	ʁ	ħ	ʕ	h	ɦ
Approximant		β̞		ʋ				ð̞		ɹ		ɹ̠		ɻ		j		ɰ						˷
Tap/flap		ⱱ̟		ⱱ					ɾ̥	ɾ			ɽ̊	ɽ						ɢ̆		ʡ̆		
Trill	ʙ̥	ʙ							r̥	r		r̠	ɽ̊r̥	ɽr					ʀ̥	ʀ	ʜ	ʢ		
Lateral affricate									tɬ	dɮ			tꞎ	d𝼅	c𝼆	ɟʎ̝	k𝼄	ɡʟ̝						
Lateral fricative							ɬ̪		ɬ	ɮ			ꞎ	𝼅	𝼆	ʎ̝	𝼄	ʟ̝						
Lateral approximant								l̪	l̥	l		l̠	ɭ̊	ɭ	ʎ̥	ʎ	ʟ̥	ʟ		ʟ̠				
Lateral tap/flap									ɺ̥	ɺ			𝼈̊	𝼈		ʎ̆		ʟ̆						

		BL	LD	D	A	PA	RF	P	V	U
Implosive	Voiced	ɓ			ɗ		ᶑ	ʄ	ɠ	ʛ
Implosive	Voiceless	ɓ̥			ɗ̥		ᶑ̊	ʄ̊	ɠ̊	ʛ̥
Ejective	Stop	pʼ			tʼ		ʈʼ	cʼ	kʼ	qʼ
Ejective	Affricate		p̪fʼ	tθʼ	tsʼ	tʃʼ	tʂʼ	tɕʼ	kxʼ	qχʼ
Ejective	Fricative	ɸʼ	fʼ	θʼ	sʼ	ʃʼ	ʂʼ	ɕʼ	xʼ	χʼ
Ejective	Lateral affricate				tɬʼ			c𝼆ʼ	k𝼄ʼ	q𝼄ʼ
Ejective	Lateral fricative				ɬʼ					
Click (top: velar; bottom: uvular)	Tenuis	kʘ qʘ		kǀ qǀ	kǃ qǃ		k𝼊 q𝼊	kǂ qǂ		
Click (top: velar; bottom: uvular)	Voiced	ɡʘ ɢʘ		ɡǀ ɢǀ	ɡǃ ɢǃ		ɡ𝼊 ɢ𝼊	ɡǂ ɢǂ		
Click (top: velar; bottom: uvular)	Nasal	ŋʘ ɴʘ		ŋǀ ɴǀ	ŋǃ ɴǃ		ŋ𝼊 ɴ𝼊	ŋǂ ɴǂ	ʞ	
Click (top: velar; bottom: uvular)	Tenuis lateral				kǁ qǁ					
Click (top: velar; bottom: uvular)	Voiced lateral				ɡǁ ɢǁ					
Click (top: velar; bottom: uvular)	Nasal lateral				ŋǁ ɴǁ					
