= Khmer =

Khmer may refer to:

== Cambodia ==
- Srok Khmer (lit. "Khmer land" or "Land of the Khmer(s)"), a colloquial exonym used to refer to Cambodia by Cambodians; see
- Khmer people, the ethnic group to which the great majority of Cambodians belong
  - Khmer Americans, Americans of Khmer (Cambodian) ancestry
  - Khmer Krom, Khmer people living in the Mekong Delta and Southeast Vietnam
  - Khmer Loeu, the Mon–Khmer highland tribes in Cambodia
  - Northern Khmer people, ethnic Khmer people of Northeast Thailand
- Khmer (Unicode block), a block of Unicode characters of the Khmer script
- Khmer architecture, the architecture of Cambodia
- Khmer cuisine, the dominant cuisine in Cambodia
- Khmer Empire, which ruled much of Indochina from the 9th to the 13th centuries
- Khmer Issarak, anti-French, Khmer nationalist political movement formed in 1945
- Khmer language, the language of the Khmers, also the official and national language of Cambodia
  - Khmer Khe dialect, a Khmeric language spoken in Stung Treng Province, Cambodia
  - Northern Khmer dialect, a dialect of the Khmer language spoken by the ethnic Khmers in Northeast Thailand
  - Western Khmer dialect, a dialect of the Khmer language spoken by the Khmers native to the Cardamom Mountains
- Khmer nationalism, a form of nationalism founded in Cambodia
- Khmer Republic, the official name of Cambodia from 1970 to 1975
- Khmer Sâ (White Khmer), a pro-US force formed by the Khmer Republic's defence minister Sak Sutsakhan
- Khmer script, the script used to write the Khmer and Khmer Loeu languages
- Khmer Serei, anti-communist and anti-monarchist guerrilla force founded by Cambodian nationalist Son Ngoc Thanh
- Political terms coined by Norodom Sihanouk based on the word 'Khmer':
  - Khmer Bleu, Sihanouk's domestic opponents on the right
  - Khmer Rouge, a Cambodian Communist political group and guerrilla movement
  - Khmer Việt Minh, Cambodian communists who lived in exile in North Vietnam after the 1954 Geneva Conference

== Other uses ==
- Khmer (album), a 1997 jazz album by Nils Petter Molvær
- Khmer: The Lost Empire of Cambodia, a 1997 nonfiction book by Thierry Zéphir

== See also ==
- Khemara (disambiguation)
