= Khmer numerals =

Numerals used in the Khmer language

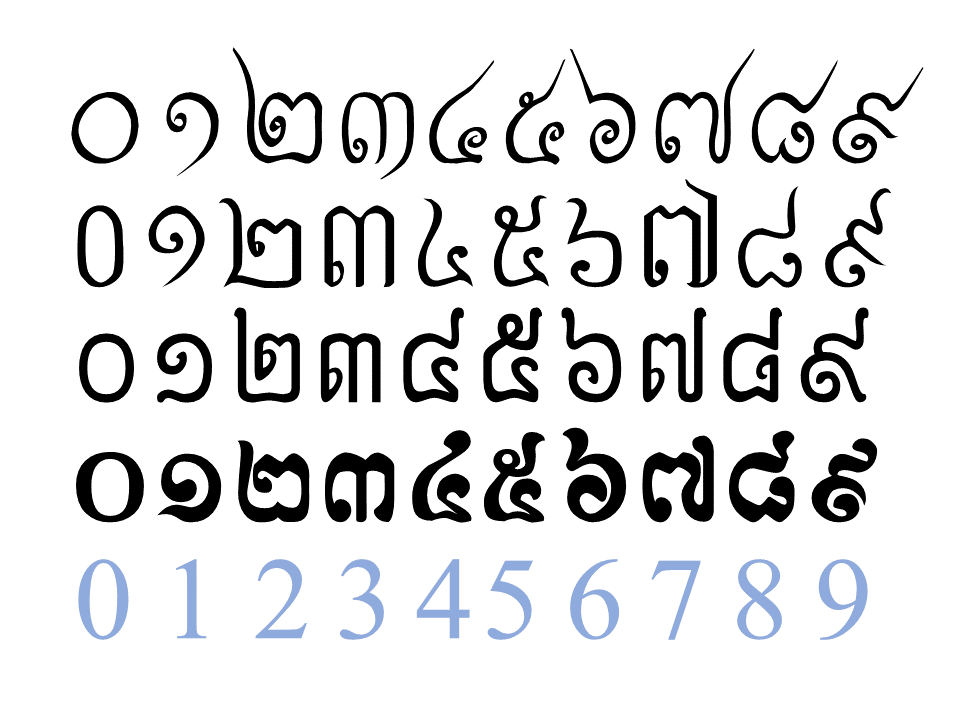
The Khmer numerals depicted in four different typographical variants comparing to Arabic numerals (blue).

Khmer numerals ០ ១ ២ ៣ ៤ ៥ ៦ ៧ ៨ ៩ are the numerals used in the script for the Khmer language. They have been in use since at least the early 7th century.

== Numerals ==
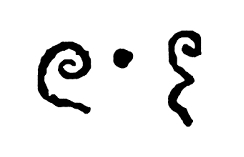
The number 605 in Khmer numerals, from the Sambor inscriptions in 683 AD. The earliest known material use of zero as a decimal figure.

Having been derived from the Hindu numerals, modern Khmer numerals also represent a decimal positional notation system. It is the script with the first extant material evidence of zero as a numerical figure, dating its use back to the seventh century, two centuries before its certain use in India. Old Khmer, or Angkorian Khmer, also possessed separate symbols for the numbers 10, 20, and 100.

Each multiple of 20 or 100 would require an additional stroke over the character, so the number 47 was constructed using the 20 symbol with an additional upper stroke, followed by the symbol for number 7. This inconsistency with its decimal system suggests that spoken Angkorian Khmer used a vigesimal system.

As both Thai and Lao scripts are derived from Old Khmer, their modern forms still bear many resemblances to the latter, demonstrated in the following table:

| Value | Khmer | Thai | Lao |
|---|---|---|---|
| 0 | ០ | ๐ | ໐ |
| 1 | ១ | ๑ | ໑ |
| 2 | ២ | ๒ | ໒ |
| 3 | ៣ | ๓ | ໓ |
| 4 | ៤ | ๔ | ໔ |
| 5 | ៥ | ๕ | ໕ |
| 6 | ៦ | ๖ | ໖ |
| 7 | ៧ | ๗ | ໗ |
| 8 | ៨ | ๘ | ໘ |
| 9 | ៩ | ๙ | ໙ |

== Modern Khmer numbers ==
The spoken names of modern Khmer numbers represent a biquinary system, with both base 5 and base 10 in use. For example, 6 (ប្រាំមួយ) is formed from 5 (ប្រាំ) plus 1 (មួយ).

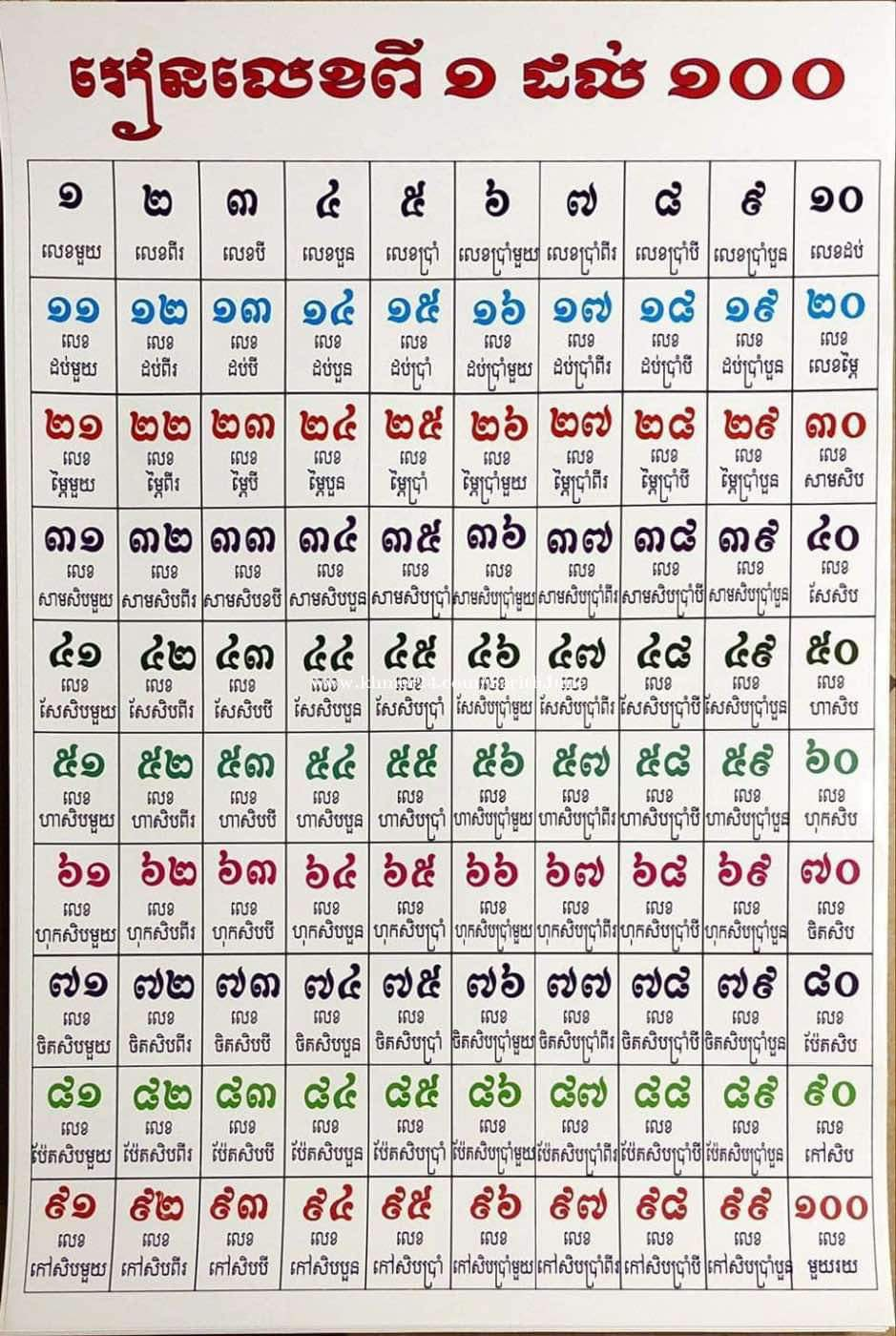
Khmer numbers

=== Numbers from 0 to 5 ===
With the exception of the number 0, which stems from Sanskrit, the etymology of the Khmer numbers from 1 to 5 is of proto-Austroasiatic origin.

| Value | Khmer | Word Form | IPA | UNGEGN | GD | ALA-LC | Notes |
|---|---|---|---|---|---|---|---|
| 0 | ០ | សូន្យ | [soːn] | sony | souny | sūny | From Sanskrit śūnya |
| 1 | ១ | មួយ | [muəj] | muŏy | muoy | muay | Before a classifier, [muəj] is reduced to [mə] in regular speech. |
| 2 | ២ | ពីរ | [piː], [pɨl] | pir | pir | bīr | |
| 3 | ៣ | បី | [ɓej] | bei | bei | pī | |
| 4 | ៤ | បួន | [ɓuən] | buŏn | buon | puan | |
| 5 | ៥ | ប្រាំ | [pram] | brăm | bram | prāṃ | |

- For details of the various alternative romanization systems, see Romanization of Khmer.
- Some authors may alternatively mark [ɓiː] as the pronunciation for the word two, and either [ɓəj] or [ɓei] for the word three.
- In neighbouring Thailand the number three is thought to bring good luck. However, in Cambodia, taking a picture with three people in it is considered bad luck, as it is believed that the person situated in the middle will die an early death.

==== Comparison to other Austroasiatic languages 1-5 ====
Whilst Vietnamese vocabulary is very Sinicized, the numbers 1-5 retain proto-Austroasiatic origins.

| Value | Khmer | Word Form | IPA | UNGEGN | Vietnamese | Muong language | Mon language | Bru language | Khmu language |
|---|---|---|---|---|---|---|---|---|---|
| 1 | ១ | មួយ | [muəj] | muŏy | một | mốch | mo̤a | mui | /mò:j/ |
| 2 | ២ | ពីរ | [piː], [pɨl] | pir | hai | hal | ɓa | bar | /pà:r/ |
| 3 | ៣ | បី | [ɓəj] | bei | ba | pa | pɔeʔ | pei | /péɂ/ |
| 4 | ៤ | បួន | [ɓuən] | buŏn | bốn | pổn | pɔn | pon | /sí:/ |
| 5 | ៥ | ប្រាំ | [pram] | brăm | năm | đằm | pəsɔn | shăng | /há:/ |

=== Numbers from 6 to 20 ===
The numbers from 6 to 9 may be constructed by adding any number between 1 and 4 to the base number 5 (ប្រាំ), so that 7 is literally constructed as 5 plus 2. Beyond that, Khmer uses a decimal base, so that 14 is constructed as 10 plus 4, rather than 2 times 5 plus 4; and 16 is constructed as 10+5+1.

Colloquially, compound numbers from eleven to nineteen may be formed using the word ដណ្ដប់ [dɔnɗɑp] preceded by any number from one to nine, so that 15 is constructed as ប្រាំដណ្ដប់ [pram dɔnɗɑp], instead of the standard ដប់ប្រាំ [ɗɑp pram].

| Value | Khmer | Word Form | IPA | UNGEGN | GD | ALA-LC | Notes |
|---|---|---|---|---|---|---|---|
| 6 | ៦ | ប្រាំមួយ | [prammuəj] | brămmuŏy | brammuoy | prāṃmuay | |
| 7 | ៧ | ប្រាំពីរ | [prampiː], [prampɨl] | brămpir | brampir | prāṃbīr | |
| 8 | ៨ | ប្រាំបី | [pramɓəj] | brămbei | brambei | prāṃpī | |
| 9 | ៩ | ប្រាំបួន | [pramɓuən] | brămbuŏn | brambuon | prāṃpuan | |
| 10 | ១០ | ដប់ | [ɗɑp] | dáb | dab | ṭáp | From an archaic Chinese form *[di̯əp]. |
| 11 | ១១ | ដប់មួយ | [ɗɑpmuəj] | dábmuŏy | dabmuoy | ṭápmuay | Colloquially មួយដណ្ដប់ muŏydândáb [muəj dɔnɗɑp]. |
| 20 | ២០ | ម្ភៃ | [mpʰej], [məpʰɨj], [mpʰɨj] | mphey | mphey | mbhai | Contraction of [muəj] + [pʰəj] (i.e. one + twenty) |

- In constructions from 6 to 9 that use 5 as a base, [pram] may alternatively be pronounced [pəm]; giving [pəmmuəj], [pəmpiː], [pəmɓəj], and [pəmɓuːən]. This is especially true in dialects which elide [r], but not necessarily restricted to them, as the pattern also follows Khmer's minor syllable pattern.

=== Numbers from 30 to 90 ===
The modern Khmer numbers from 30 to 90 are as follows:

| Value | Khmer | Word Form | IPA | UNGEGN | GD | ALA-LC | Notes |
|---|---|---|---|---|---|---|---|
| 30 | ៣០ | សាមសិប | [saːm.səp] | samsĕb | samseb | sāmsip | From Thai สามสิบ sam sip |
| 40 | ៤០ | សែសិប | [sae.səp] | sêsĕb | saeseb | saesip | From Thai, สี่สิบ si sip |
| 50 | ៥០ | ហាសិប | [haːsəp] | hasĕb | haseb | hāsip | From Thai, ห้าสิบ hasip |
| 60 | ៦០ | ហុកសិប | [hok.səp] | hŏksĕb | hokseb | huksip | From Thai, หกสิบ hoksip |
| 70 | ៧០ | ចិតសិប | [cət.səp] | chĕtsĕb | chetseb | citsip | From Thai, เจ็ดสิบ chetsip |
| 80 | ៨០ | ប៉ែតសិប | [paet.səp] | pêtsĕb | paetseb | p″aetsip | From Thai, แปดสิบ paetsip |
| 90 | ៩០ | កៅសិប | [kaw.səp] | kausĕb | kauseb | kausip | From Thai, เก้าสิบ kaosip |

- The word សិប [səp], which appears in each of these numbers, can be dropped in informal or colloquial speech. For example, the number 81 can be expressed as ប៉ែតមួយ [paet.muəj] instead of the full ប៉ែតសិបមួយ [paet.səp.muəj].

Historically speaking, Khmer borrowed the numbers from 30 to 90 from a southern Middle Chinese variety by way of a neighboring Tai language, most likely Thai. This is evidenced by the fact that the numbers in Khmer most closely resemble those of Thai, having already gone through Tai-Kadai sound changes rather than being directly borrowed from said Chinese variety, as well as the fact that the numbers cannot be deconstructed in Khmer. For instance, សែ [sae] is not used on its own to mean "four" in Khmer and សិប [səp] is not used on its own to mean "ten", while they are in Thai (see Thai numerals). The table below shows how the words in Khmer compare to other nearby Tai and Sinitic languages.

Language comparison
| Value | Khmer | Southwestern Tai | | | Northern Tai | Sinitic | | | | |
| Value | Khmer | Thai | Archaic Thai | Lao | S. Zhuang | Nanning | Cantonese | Teochew | Hokkien | Mandarin |
|---|---|---|---|---|---|---|---|---|---|---|
| 3 ‒ | *saːm | sam | sǎam | sãam | ɬaːm^{1} | ɬam^{41} | saam^{1} | sã^{1} | sa^{1} (sam^{1}) | sān |
| 4 ‒ | *sɐe | si | sài | sii | ɬi^{5} | ɬi^{55} | sei^{3} | si^{3} | si^{3} (su^{3}) | sì |
| 5 ‒ | *haː | ha | ngùa | hàa | ha^{3} | ŋ̩^{13} | ng^{5} | ŋou^{6} | go^{2} (ngo^{2}) | wǔ |
| 6 ‒ | *hok | hok | lòk | hók | huk^{7} | løk^{24} | luk^{6} | lak^{8} | lak^{2} (liok^{8}) | liù |
| 7 ‒ | *cət | chet | jèd | jét | tɕit^{7} | tsʰɐt^{33} | cat^{1} | tsʰik^{4} | chit^{2} | qī |
| 8 ‒ | *pɐət | paet | pàed | pàet | pet^{7} | pat^{33} | baat^{3} | poiʔ^{4} | pueh^{4} (pat^{4}) | bā |
| 9 ‒ | *kaw | kao | jao | kâo | kau^{3} | kou^{33} | gau^{2} | kao^{2} | kau^{4} (kiu^{2}) | jiǔ |
| 10 ‒ | *səp | sip | jǒng | síp | ɬip^{7} | ɕɐp^{22} | sap^{6} | tsap^{8} | tzhap^{2} (sip^{8}) | shí |

- Words in parentheses indicate literary pronunciations, while words preceded by an asterisk only occur in specific constructions and are not used for basic numbers from 3 to 10.

Prior to using a decimal system and adopting these words, Khmer used a base 20 system, so that numbers greater than 20 were formed by multiplying or adding on to the cardinal number for twenty. Under this system, 30 would've been constructed as (20 × 1) + 10 "twenty-one ten" and 80 was constructed as 4 × 20 "four twenties / four scores". See the section Angkorian numbers for details.

=== Numbers from 100 to 10,000,000 ===
The standard Khmer numbers starting from one hundred are as follows:

| Value | Khmer | Word Form | IPA | UNGEGN | GD | ALA-LC | Notes |
|---|---|---|---|---|---|---|---|
| 100 | ១០០ | មួយរយ | [muəj.rɔːj] ([rɔːj], [mə.rɔːj]) | muŏy rôy | muoy roy | muay raya | From Thai, ร้อย roi. |
| 1,000 | ១,០០០ | មួយពាន់ | [muəj.pŏən] | muŏy poăn | muoy poan | muaya bân | From Thai, พัน phan. |
| 10,000 | ១០,០០០ | មួយម៉ឺន | [muəj.məɨn] | muŏy mœn | muoy mueun | muaya mȳna | From Thai, หมื่น muen. |
| 100,000 | ១០០,០០០ | មួយសែន | [muəj.saen] | muŏy sên | muoy saen | muaya saena | From Thai, แสน saen. |
| 1,000,000 | ១,០០០,០០០ | មួយលាន | [muəj.lien] | muŏy léan | muoy lean | muaya lâna | From Thai, ล้าน lan. |
| 10,000,000 | ១០,០០០,០០០ | មួយកោដិ | [muəj.kaot] | muŏy kaôdĕ | muoy kaot | muaya koṭi | From Sanskrit and Pali koṭi. |

Although មួយកោដិ [muəj kaot] is most commonly used to mean ten million, in some areas this is also colloquially used to refer to one billion (which is more properly មួយរយកោដិ [muəj rɔj kaot]). In order to avoid confusion, sometimes ដប់លាន [ɗɑp.liən] is used to mean ten million, along with មួយរយលាន [muəj.rɔj.liən] for one hundred million, and មួយពាន់លាន [muəj.pŏən.liən] ("one thousand million") to mean one billion.

Different Cambodian dialects may also employ different base number constructions to form greater numbers above one thousand. A few of the such can be observed in the following table:

| Value | Khmer | Word Form | IPA | UNGEGN | GD | ALA-LC | Notes |
|---|---|---|---|---|---|---|---|
| 10,000 | ១០,០០០ | ដប់ពាន់ | [ɗɑp pŏən] | dáb poăn | dab poan | ṭáp bân | lit. "ten thousand" |
| 100,000 | ១០០,០០០ | ដប់ម៉ឺន | [ɗɑp məɨn] | dáb mœŭn | dab mueun | ṭáp mȳna | lit. "ten ten-thousand" |
| 100,000 | ១០០,០០០ | មួយរយពាន់ | [muəj rɔj pŏən] | muŏy rôy poăn | muoy roy poan | muaya raya bân | lit. "one hundred thousand" |
| 1,000,000 | ១,០០០,០០០ | មួយរយម៉ឺន | [muəj rɔj məɨn] | muŏy rôy mœn | muoy roy mueun | muaya raya mȳna | lit. "one hundred ten-thousand" |
| 10,000,000 | ១០,០០០,០០០ | ដប់លាន | [ɗɑp liən] | dáb léan | dab lean | ṭáp lāna | lit. "ten million" |
| 100,000,000 | ១០០,០០០,០០០ | មួយរយលាន | [muəj rɔj liən] | muŏy rôy léan | muoy roy lean | muaya raya lāna | lit. "one hundred million" |
| 1,000,000,000 | ១,០០០,០០០,០០០ | មួយពាន់លាន | [muəj pŏən liən] | muŏy poăn léan | muoy poan lean | muaya bân lāna | lit. "one thousand million" |

=== Counting fruits ===
Reminiscent of the standard base 20 Angkorian Khmer numbers, the modern Khmer language also possesses separate words used to count fruits, not unlike how English uses words such as a "dozen" for counting items such as eggs.

| Value | Khmer | Word form | IPA | UNGEGN | GD | ALA-LC | Notes |
|---|---|---|---|---|---|---|---|
| 4 | ៤ | ដំប, ដំបរ | [dɑmbɑː] | dâmbâ, dâmbâr | damba | ṭaṃpa | |
| 40 | ៤០ | ផ្លូន | [pʰloun] | phlon | phloun | phlūna | From (pre-)Angkorian *plon "40" |
| 80 | ៨០ | ពីរផ្លូន | [piː ploun], [pɨl ploun] | pir phlon | pi phloun | bīra phlūna | Lit. "two forty" |
| 400 | ៤០០ | ស្លឹក | slək | slœ̆k | sloek | slẏka | From (pre-)Angkorian *slik "400" |

=== Sanskrit and Pali influence ===
As a result of prolonged literary influence from both the Sanskrit and Pali languages, Khmer may occasionally use borrowed words for counting. Generally speaking, aside from a few exceptions such as the numbers for 0 and 100 for which the Khmer language has no equivalent, they are more often restricted to literary, religious, and historical texts than they are used in day-to-day conversations. One reason for the decline of these numbers is that a Khmer nationalism movement, which emerged in the 1960s, attempted to remove all words of Sanskrit and Pali origin. The Khmer Rouge also attempted to cleanse the language by removing all words which were considered politically incorrect.

| Value | Khmer | Word form | IPA | UNGEGN | GD | ALA-LC | Notes |
|---|---|---|---|---|---|---|---|
| 10 | ១០ | ទស | [tŭəh] | tôs | tos | dasa | From Sanskrit and Pali, dasa |
| 12 | ១២ | ទ្វាទស | [tviətŭəh], [tviətĕəsaʔ] | tvéatôs | tveatos, tveateaksak | dvādasa | From Sanskrit and Pali dvādasa |
| 13 or 30 | ១៣ or ៣០ | ត្រីទស | [trəjtŭəh] | treitôs | treitos | trīdasa | From Sanskrit and Pali, trayodasa |
| 28 | ២៨ | អស្តាពីស | [ʔahsɗaːpiːsɑː] | âsdapisâ | asdapisa | ‛astābīsa | From Sanskrit (8, aṣṭá-) (20, vimsati) |
| 100 | ១០០ | សត | [sataʔ] | sâtâ | saktak | sata | From Sanskrit, sata |

=== Ordinal numbers ===
Khmer ordinal numbers are formed by placing the word ទី [tiː] in front of a cardinal number. This is similar to the use of ที่ thi in Thai, and thứ (次) in Vietnamese.

| Meaning | Khmer | IPA | UNGEGN | GD | ALA-LC | Notes |
|---|---|---|---|---|---|---|
| First | ទីមួយ | [tiː muəj] | ti muŏy | ti muoy | dī muaya | |
| Second | ទីពីរ | [tiː piː], [tiː pɨl] | ti pir | ti pi | dī bīra | |
| Third | ទីបី | [tiː ɓəj] | ti bĕi | ti bei | dī pī | |

== Angkorian numbers ==
It is generally assumed that the Angkorian and pre-Angkorian numbers also represented a dual base (quinquavigesimal) system, with both base 5 and base 20 in use. Unlike modern Khmer, the decimal system was highly limited, with both the numbers for ten and one hundred being borrowed from the Chinese and Sanskrit languages respectively. Angkorian Khmer also used Sanskrit numbers for recording dates, sometimes mixing them with Khmer originals, a practice which has persisted until the last century.

The numbers for twenty, forty, and four hundred may be followed by multiplying numbers, with additional digits added on at the end, so that 27 is constructed as twenty-one-seven, or 20×1+7.

| Value | Khmer | Orthography | Notes |
|---|---|---|---|
| 1 | ១ | mvay | |
| 2 | ២ | vyar | |
| 3 | ៣ | pi | |
| 4 | ៤ | pvan | |
| 5 | ៥ | pram | (7 : pramvyar or pramvyal) |
| 10 | ១០ | tap | From an archaic Chinese form *di̯əp. |
| 20 | ២០ | bhai | |
| 40 | ៤០ | plon | |
| 80 | ៨០ | bhai pvan | Literally "four twenty" |
| 100 | ១០០ | çata | Sanskrit (100, sata). |
| 400 | ៤០០ | slik | |

== Proto-Khmer numbers ==
Proto-Khmer is the hypothetical ancestor of the modern Khmer language bearing various reflexes of the proposed proto-Mon–Khmer language. By comparing both modern Khmer and Angkorian Khmer numbers to those of other Eastern Mon–Khmer (or Khmero-Vietic) languages such as Pearic, Proto-Viet–Muong, Katuic, and Bahnaric; it is possible to establish the following reconstructions for Proto-Khmer.

=== Numbers from 5 to 10 ===
Contrary to later forms of the Khmer numbers, Proto-Khmer possessed a single decimal number system. The numbers from one to five correspond to both the modern Khmer language and the proposed Mon–Khmer language, while the numbers from six to nine do not possess any modern remnants, with the number ten *kraaj (or *kraay) corresponding to the modern number for one hundred. It is likely that the initial *k, found in the numbers from six to ten, is a prefix.

| Value | Khmer | Reconstruction | Notes |
|---|---|---|---|
| 5 | ៥ | *pram | |
| 6 | ៦ | *krɔɔŋ | |
| 7 | ៧ | *knuul | |
| 8 | ៨ | *ktii | Same root as the word hand, *tii. |
| 9 | ៩ | *ksaar | |
| 10 | ១០ | *kraaj | Corresponds to present-day /rɔj/ (one hundred). |
