= Khemara =

Khemara or Khemara- (Khmer: ខេមរា, UNGEGN: Khémôréa, ALA-LC: Khemarā [kʰeːmaraː]; Khmer: ខេមរ-, UNGEGN: Khémôrô-, ALA-LC: Khemara- [kʰeːmaraʔ-, -ra-]) is the formal term for Khmer in the Khmer language. It is used as a personal name as well as organization names. It is also written as Khemarak (Khmer: ខេមរៈ, UNGEGN: Khémôreă, ALA-LC: Khemarà [kʰeːmaraʔ]) and different suffixes.

== Institutions and organizations ==
- Khemara Keila FC, a football club based in Phnom Penh, Cambodia
- Khemara (NGO)
- Khemarak University, a university in Kampong Speu Province, Cambodia
- Royal Cambodian Armed Forces (កងយោធពលខេមរភូមិន្ទ, Kang Youtheapol Khemaraphumin)
- Cambodian Scouts (ខេមរកាយារិទ្ធិកម្ពុជា, Khemarak Kayarit Kampuchea)

== Places ==
- Khemarin Palace, one of the palaces in the Royal Palace of Cambodia’s complex
- Khemarat District, a district in Ubon Ratchathani Province, Thailand

== See also ==
- Khmer (disambiguation)
