= Middle Khmer =

Khmer

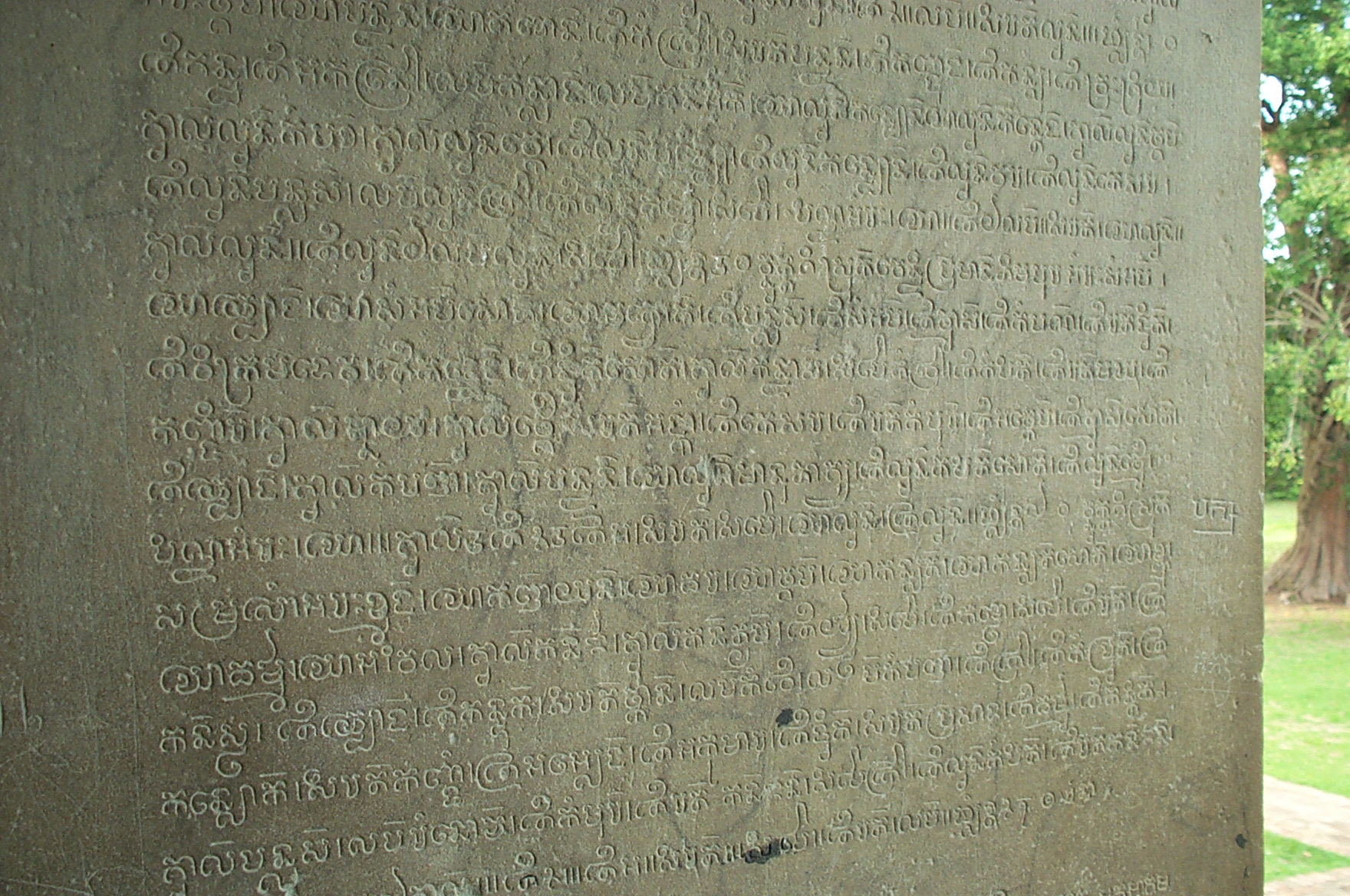
- An inscription in Middle Khmer
- Region: Cambodia, parts of Thailand, Laos and Vietnam
- Era: developed into Khmer, Northern Khmer, Western Khmer and Khmer Krom by the 18th century
- Language family: Austroasiatic: Middle Khmer
- Early form: Old Khmer

Language codes
- ISO 639-3: xhm
- Glottolog: midd1376

Middle Khmer is the historical stage of the Khmer language as it existed between the 14th and 18th centuries, spanning the period between Old Khmer and the modern language. The beginning of the Middle Khmer period roughly coincides with the fall of the Khmer Empire to the Siamese Ayutthaya Kingdom and the period of Cambodian history popularly referred to as the Post-Angkor Period. The Middle Khmer period was a stage of transition which saw relatively rapid and dramatic changes, especially in phonology, that ended with the emergence of a language recognizable as Modern Khmer approximately concurrent with the 1777 coronation of Ang Eng, the father of the poet-king Ang Duong.

Khmer has been written in an Indic-based script since the 6th–7th century. Old Khmer and the changes of Middle Khmer are recorded by an extensive epigraphy, which has allowed Middle Khmer to be reconstructed and studied. During the Middle Khmer period, the language lost the voiced stops of Old Khmer, which resulted in comprehensive compensatory changes to the vowel system. Old Khmer vowels following the formerly voiced stops remained mostly unchanged, while the same vowels following the originally corresponding voiceless initials were lowered by different processes including diphthongization. Furthermore, the loss of final "-r", all but complete in most modern Khmer dialects, and the merger of syllable-final -/s/ to -/h/ took place during the Middle Khmer period.

Middle Khmer is attested in a wide variety of texts as well as inscriptions of the era. Middle Khmer evolved into three modern languages: Northern Khmer, Western Khmer and the various dialects of Central Khmer, including Standard Khmer and Khmer Krom.

== History ==
"Old Khmer" describes the language as it existed until the 14th century. It was the language of three successive polities in the region, Funan, Chenla and the Khmer Empire (Angkor), which, at its zenith, ruled much of mainland Southeast Asia from the Mekong Delta west to the Andaman Sea and from the Gulf of Thailand north to China. Old Khmer was the language of the ruling Khmers and the language of administration throughout the empire. After the 14th century sack of Angkor by the Siamese Ayutthaya Kingdom, the Khmer Empire was terminally weakened and steadily lost both its hegemony and prestige in the region. Territory north of the Dangrek mountains was lost to Lao kingdoms while the west and northwest succumbed to the forerunners of the Thais. The Mekong Delta was lost to Vietnam. The center of Khmer culture retreated southeast and eventually was reduced to a small wedge between its powerful neighbors, Thailand and Vietnam, both of which vied for control of the rump polity as a vassal state.

It is within this context, the collapse of the Khmer Empire, that Old Khmer began to quickly evolve into Middle Khmer. All modern varieties of Khmer descend directly from the "break-up of speech communities" that occurred during the Middle Khmer period. Comparative methods applied to modern varieties, along with the wealth of Middle Khmer texts, have given linguists a good picture of Middle Khmer. However, since there are no other extant descendants of Old Khmer, linguists must rely on analysis of its epigraphy and orthography, as well as the descriptions of Middle Khmer, to internally reconstruct Old Khmer. While this makes understanding Middle Khmer important, it has severely hindered the investigation and reconstruction of Proto-Khmer.

=== Early Middle Khmer ===
Informally, linguists speak of two periods of Middle Khmer based on availability of sources. Evidence of the language dated with surety from the 14th to early 17th century is scant. The many Middle Khmer texts are undated. Internal evidence gives estimates of chronological ordering, but not absolute dates. It is assumed that many of the latest texts date to the time of King Ang Duong (1789–1859), to whom is attributed the cbap srei ("Conduct for Ladies"). Analysis of metrical rhymes in the cbap literature indicated that among the earliest cbap were the ker kala and kuna cau which could have dated from the early middle period. Much of the phonological changes that mark Middle Khmer were already established and many others were well underway by the time of Late Middle Khmer and the processes occurring in the early period oftentimes must be inferred by comparing Late Old Khmer with the language of later Middle Khmer texts.

=== Late Middle Khmer ===
Late Middle Khmer is the period for which we have the most evidence. In addition to inscriptions, there are palm-leaf manuscript from multiple genres or disciplines, including chronicles, romances, ethical treatises and technical manuals. The devoicing of stops were complete by this time and the new vowel inventory was beginning to take shape.

== Phonology ==
The phonological inventory of the earliest Middle Khmer closely resembles that of Old Khmer. The consonants and vowels of the language before the major sound changes occurred are listed below. The voiced implosives [ɓ] and [ɗ] may have contrasted with [b] and [d], which is rather rare, or the two sets may have evolved during different stages of Middle Khmer and never have contrasted. The vowels in parentheses are assumed to have been used in early Middle Khmer but this has never been proved nor disproved. In addition to the vowel nuclei listed, there were two diphthongs inherited from Old Khmer, [iə] and [uə], and a third, [ɨə], entered the language via loanwords from Thai.

		Bilabial		Alveolar		Palatal	Velar	Glottal
Plosive	Aspirated	pʰ		tʰ		cʰ	kʰ	
Plosive	Voiceless	p		t		c	k	ʔ
Plosive	Voiced	ɓ	b	ɗ	d	ɟ	ɡ	
Nasal	Voiced	m		n		ɲ	ŋ	
Fricative	Voiceless			s				h
Approximant	Voiced	w		l		j		
Trill	Voiced			r				

	Front		Central		Back	
	short	long	short	long	short	long
Close	i	iː	ɨ	ɨː	u	uː
Close-mid	(e)	eː	ə	əː	(o)	oː
Open-mid	(ɛ)	ɛː				
Open			a	aː	ɔ	ɔː

The impetus for the major changes that took place during Middle Khmer was the devoicing of the Old Khmer voiced stops. Unlike the modern language, Old Khmer contrasted voiced stops /ɡ ɟ d b/ with unvoiced /k c t p/ and had a simple vowels system consisting of eight or nine long monophthongs with short counterparts and two diphthongs. Vowels following the former series came to take on a secondary characteristic breathy phonation. Thus, when the two consonant series merged in articulation, the contrast was maintained in the following vowels. Vowels following the originally voiceless stops were lowered in quality, in most cases manifesting on-gliding diphthongs. As the shift progressed, the on-glide became the focus of a new vowel nucleus. In words with /aː/, which can't be lowered, it was the vowel following the formerly voiced consonants that diphthongized.

This left the language with two redundant series of consonants and a complementary set of contrasting vowels for each consonant series, effectively doubling the number of vowel nuclei in the language. The formerly voiced stops are referred to as "high register" while the formerly voiceless stops are called "low register". While each vowel symbol represented a single value in Old and Early Middle Khmer, this restructuring meant that the register of the preceding consonant symbol indicated different vowel pronunciations. The secondary characteristic of breathy phonation in the high register became redundant with the development of contrasting vowels for each series and was gradually lost in most dialects by the modern era. Breathy voice versus clear voice still contrast in Western Khmer and breathy voice in some high register vowels may still be heard in Central Khmer but it is incidental and conveys no lexical meaning; speakers are unaware of it.

[ɡiː] > [ɡi̤ː] > [kiː]
[kiː] > [kᵊiː] > [kəi]

[ɟɛː] > [ɟɛ̤ː] > [cɛː]
[cɛː] > [c^{a}ɛː] > [caɛ] ~ [cae]

[ɡaːŋ] > [ɡa̤ːŋ] > [ɡ^{e}aːŋ] (modern: [kiəŋ])
[kaːŋ] > [kaːŋ] > [kaːŋ]

There is some disagreement as to when this process of devoicing and diphthongization completed, but all estimates fall within the 16th to 18th century range. Jenner, based on internal evidence, gives a basic general range between the 16th to 18th century, concluding it wasn't possible to get anymore specific due to the undated nature of most Middle Khmer texts. Lewitz's argument cites foreign transliterations of "Angkor" (Middle Khmer: [ʔɔŋgɔːr]), which in the 16th century were written "Angar" or "Angor" with a ⟨g⟩ and, by the 17th century had become "Anckoor" with a ⟨k⟩, to posit that the actual devoicing of stops took place late in Middle Khmer, between the 16th and 17th century, and was completed by the 18th century. Vickery, using the same method with a larger word list, concluded that Spanish and Portuguese transliterations of Middle Khmer words proved the devoicing of stops culminated in the last two decades of the 16th century, much earlier than Lewitz's estimate.

=== Reacquisition of voiced stops ===
Despite having lost voiced stops, all modern Khmer varieties emerged from the Middle Khmer period with two in their inventory, /b/ and /d/. In both cases, it is the Old Khmer voiceless stop that is now voiced and their realizations are most commonly implosive [ɓ] and [ɗ], respectively. A thorough analysis of Middle Khmer must explain both how, if voiced stops merged to voiceless stops, only /b/ and /d/ reemerged and had a distinct evolution from /p/ and /t/ as well as why the Old Khmer voiceless /p/ and /t/ were the consonants to "reacquire" voicing instead of the originally voiced series.

This shift has historically received less attention from linguists than the evolution of registers and the complicated vowel systems. Earlier hypotheses assumed Old Khmer, similar to other languages of Southeast Asia, had, in addition to */b/ ~ */p/ ~ */pʰ/ and */d/ ~ */t/ ~ */tʰ/, a fourth series that was both voiced and either implosive ([ɓ], [ɗ]), preglottalized ([ˀb], [ˀd]) or pre-nasalized ([ᵐb], *[ⁿd]). According to these early hypotheses, since the Indic-based writing system had no symbol for these sounds, the Old Khmer letters for /p/ and /t/ did double duty, also representing this fourth series. As the Old Khmer voiced series became devoiced in Middle Khmer, the letters previously used for /b/ and /d/ came to be indicate pronunciations of /p/ and /t/, respectively, so the letters for original /p/ and /t/ became redundant and were used only for the fourth series, which then normalized to /b/ ([ɓ]) and /d/ ([ɗ]) as part of the Middle Khmer consonant restructuring. These hypotheses, based on assumptions about Proto-Mon-Khmer and orthographic conjecture, did not take into account phonation or account for the intricacies of the vowel system.

More recently, there have been two theories as to how this seeming "flip-flop" occurred, both of which elegantly integrate the phenomenon into the devoicing shift and attribute the redevelopment of voiced /b/ and /d/ to the complicated phonological details of that process. Diffloth proposed a five-stage process presented in the table below as given by Wayland and Jongman:

Diffloth's theory
Stage	Consonant and Vowel contrast				Notes
1	pV-	tV-	cV-	kV-	Early Middle Khmer; voiceless and voiced stops contrast; vowels are the same regardless of consonant voicing
1	bV-	dV-	ɟV-	ɡV-	Early Middle Khmer; voiceless and voiced stops contrast; vowels are the same regardless of consonant voicing
2	pV-	tV-	cV-	kV-	voiced and voiceless stops still contrast; vowels following voiced consonants begin to take on redundant breathy phonation
2	bV̤-	dV̤-	ɟV̤-	ɡV̤-	voiced and voiceless stops still contrast; vowels following voiced consonants begin to take on redundant breathy phonation
2.5	ɓV-	ɗV-	cV-	kV-	intermediate stage; breathy voice vs modal voice contrast strengthens; modal voice vowels force preceding /p/ and /t/ to develop implosion; /ɓ/ contrasts with /b/
2.5	bV̤-	dV̤-	ɟV̤-	ɡV̤-	intermediate stage; breathy voice vs modal voice contrast strengthens; modal voice vowels force preceding /p/ and /t/ to develop implosion; /ɓ/ contrasts with /b/
3	ɓV-	ɗV-	cV-	kV-	voiced stops devoice; contrast is maintained by vowel phonation; /ɓ/ now contrasts with /p/
3	pV̤-	tV̤-	cV̤-	kV̤-	voiced stops devoice; contrast is maintained by vowel phonation; /ɓ/ now contrasts with /p/
4	ɓV_{1}-	ɗV_{1}-	cV_{1}-	kV_{1}-	stop devoicing is complete; phonation affects vowel quality: modal voice vowels lower and begin to diphthongize; breathy voice vowels maintain former qualities; this stage took the longest to complete
4	pV̤-	tV̤-	cV̤-	kV̤-	stop devoicing is complete; phonation affects vowel quality: modal voice vowels lower and begin to diphthongize; breathy voice vowels maintain former qualities; this stage took the longest to complete
5	ɓV_{1}-	ɗV_{1}-	cV_{1}-	kV_{1}-	first (low) register vowels sufficiently differentiated, redundant phonation becomes non-contrastive and is lost
5	pV-	tV-	cV-	kV-	first (low) register vowels sufficiently differentiated, redundant phonation becomes non-contrastive and is lost

Wayland and Jongman's theory
Stage	Consonant and Vowel contrast				Notes
1	pV-	tV-	cV-	kV-	Early Middle Khmer; voiceless and voiced stops contrast; vowels are the same regardless of consonant voicing
1	bV-	dV-	ɟV-	ɡV-	Early Middle Khmer; voiceless and voiced stops contrast; vowels are the same regardless of consonant voicing
2	b̬V-	d̬V-	ɟ̬V-	ɡ̬V-	voiced stops take on a slack voice and voiceless stops become stiff voiced; vowels still do not contrast phonation; /b̬/ contrasts with /b̥/
2	b̥V-	d̥V-	ɟ̊V-	ɡ̊V-	voiced stops take on a slack voice and voiceless stops become stiff voiced; vowels still do not contrast phonation; /b̬/ contrasts with /b̥/
2.5	b̬V-	d̬V-	ɟ̬V-	ɡ̬V-	intermediate stage; vowels following slack consonants begin to take on redundant breathy phonation; /b̬/ still contrasts with /b̥/
2.5	b̥V̤-	d̥V̤-	ɟ̊V̤-	ɡ̊V̤-	intermediate stage; vowels following slack consonants begin to take on redundant breathy phonation; /b̬/ still contrasts with /b̥/
3	b̬V_{1}-	d̬V_{1}-	ɟ̬V_{1}-	ɡ̬V_{1}-	phonation affects vowel quality: modal voice vowels lower and begin to diphthongize; breathy voice vowels maintain former qualities; this stage took the longest to complete
3	b̥V̤-	d̥V̤-	ɟ̊V̤-	ɡ̊V̤-	phonation affects vowel quality: modal voice vowels lower and begin to diphthongize; breathy voice vowels maintain former qualities; this stage took the longest to complete
4	ɓV_{1}-	ɗV_{1}-	cV_{1}-	kV_{1}-	/b̬/ and /d̬/ develop implosion; pulmonic stops unvoice; /ɓ/ now contrasts with /p/
4	pV̤-	tV̤-	cV̤-	kV̤-	/b̬/ and /d̬/ develop implosion; pulmonic stops unvoice; /ɓ/ now contrasts with /p/
5	ɓV_{1}-	ɗV_{1}-	cV_{1}-	kV_{1}-	first (low) register vowels sufficiently differentiated, redundant phonation becomes non-contrastive and is lost
5	pV-	tV-	cV-	kV-	first (low) register vowels sufficiently differentiated, redundant phonation becomes non-contrastive and is lost

The second theory, proposed by Wayland and Jongman, also postulates five stages of development with results similar to Diffloth's but reached by different means. In their second stage, the voiced stops take on a slack voice quality which causes following vowels to become breathy voiced while the voiceless stops become stiff voiced. In the third stage, slack vs stiff voice stops still contrast and the formant transitions from stiff voiced stops to following vowels begin to affect the vowels by lowering and then were reinterpreted as diphthongization. In stage four, the abrupt release of stiff voice gradually conditions /p/ and /t/ to become the voiced implosives /ɓ/ and /ɗ/ while slack voiced /b̥/ and /d̥/ become /p/ and /t/. The redundant breathy phonation is minimized and lost in most dialects in the fifth phase. In this proposal, /b/ and /d/ never contrast with /ɓ/ and /ɗ/ and most dialects are never truly "register languages" as vowel phonation is never the sole contrastive element.

In this theory, stage two and stage four take the most time to develop and there is overlap between the stages. According to the authors, this theory best accounts for all the shifts and phonological processes involved as well as explains the current situation in Modern Khmer. The shift is complete in Central Khmer, Northern Khmer and Khmer Krom, the three modern varieties representing the overwhelming majority of Khmer speakers. Western Khmer is still between stages four and five; /b/ and /d/ are present, but many vowels have not diphthongized or are in the early stages of diphthongization (i.e. still consist of a monophthong plus a slight glide) and the breathy versus clear phonation contrast is still prominent in most vowels although it is displaying an increasingly lower functional load. This is taken as further validation of the mechanisms proposed in the development of Middle Khmer.

=== Final consonants ===
Old Khmer allowed 15 consonants in syllable-final position, including /s/ and /r/ in addition to the 13 presently allowed in modern Khmer. Final /s/ and /r/ are still reflected in modern Khmer orthography, but during the Middle Khmer period, syllable-final /s/ simply debuccalized to /h/ and it is now pronounced /h/ in all modern varieties while the fate of syllable-final /r/ was not so simple. Texts written in verse throughout the Middle Khmer era demonstrate that the sound of written final /r/ was confused with, and probably pronounced as or similar to, final /l/. In the poetic meters, words written with final /r/ were often used as if they rhymed with words written with final /l/. In fact, /-r : -l/ rhymes were more common than /-r : -r/ rhymes, especially in the very early years of Middle Khmer, indicating that Old Khmer final /r/ was already weakening by the beginning of Middle Khmer. This trend continued gradually throughout the Middle Khmer period so that by the transition to Early Modern Khmer, /-r : -Ø/ rhymes were used instead of /-r : -l/, which agrees with the fact that written final /r/ is unpronounced in modern Central Khmer.

The loss of final /r/ was not as complete as the loss of final /s/, however. Final /r/ is still pronounced prominently in Northern Khmer and by some speakers of Western Khmer. Also remnants of the early Middle Khmer /r/ > /l/ merger are still evident in Central Khmer where Middle Khmer */kɑntor/ ("rat") is pronounced /kɑndol/ ~ /kɑndao/, */prampiːr/ ("seven") as /prampɨl/, and */her/ ("hot, spicy") as /hɨl/ ~ /haə/. Excepting few similar examples, written final /r/ in modern Central Khmer dialects is silent: */kaːr/ > /kaː/. The exact phonetic realization of final /r/ in Middle Khmer has not been proven with certainty. It may have varied by dialect, either being [r], [l] or [Ø] (silent), although rhymes within a single text often suggest all three, indicating the pronunciation wasn't dialectal but rather the shift may have taken place gradually, affecting final /r/ in different environments in stages until /Ø/ gained prominence. Jenner suggests, by inference, that written final /r/ may have been pronounced [ɹl] in Early Middle Khmer.

The remainder of the final consonants that are allowed in modern Khmer correspond well with written forms from Old Khmer, which suggests that they were unchanged during the Middle Khmer period.
