= Western Khmer dialect =

Conservative Khmer dialect of Cambodia and Thailand

Western Khmer
- Cardamom Khmer; Chanthaburi Khmer
- Native to: Thailand, Cambodia
- Region: Cardamom Mountains
- Language family: Austroasiatic: Khmer; Western Khmer

Language codes
- ISO 639-3: –
- Linguist List: khm-car
- Glottolog: None

Western Khmer, also known as Cardamom Khmer or Chanthaburi Khmer, is a dialect of the Khmer language spoken by the Khmer people native to the Cardamom Mountains on both sides of the border between western Cambodia (Pailin Province) and eastern Central Thailand (Chanthaburi Province). Developing in an historically isolated region, Western Khmer is the only dialect of modern Khmer to conserve the Middle Khmer phonation contrast of breathy voice versus modal voice that has been all but lost in the other dialects.

== Phonology ==
=== Consonants ===
	Labial	Alveolar	Palatal	Velar	Glottal
Plosive	p (pʰ)	t (tʰ)	c (cʰ)	k (kʰ)	ʔ
Voiced plosive	b	d			
Nasal	m	n	ɲ	ŋ	
Liquid		r l			
Fricative	(f)	s			h
Approximant	w		j		

(f) in loan words

=== Vowels ===
Clear Vowels
	Front		Central		Back	
	short	long	short	long	short	long
Close						
Close-mid	e	eː	ə		o	
Open-mid	ɛ	ɛː				
Open	a	aː	ɒ	ɒː		

Breathy Vowels
	Front		Central		Back	
	short	long	short	long	short	long
Close	i̤	i̤ː	ɨ̤	ɨ̤ː	ṳ	ṳː
Close-mid		e̤ː		ə̤ː	o̤	o̤ː
Open-mid		ɛ̤ː				ɔ̤ː
Open	a̤					
