= Proto-Khmeric language =

Reconstructed ancestor of the Khmeric languages

Proto-Khmeric
- Reconstruction of: Khmer dialects
- Reconstructed ancestor: Proto-Austroasiatic

The Proto-Khmeric language is the reconstructed proto-language of the Khmeric languages. It has been reconstructed by Sidwell & Rau (2015), whose reconstruction is based on the sound laws provided in Ferlus (1992). It is agreed by most scholars that this language was phased out by 300 CE.

== Reconstructed forms ==
The reconstructed Proto-Khmeric forms below are from Sidwell & Rau (2015: 273, 340-363).

Gloss	Proto-Khmeric
all	*grɔp
ashes	*pheːh
bark (of tree)	*smpɔːk
belly	*buŋ
big	*luoŋ ~ *ruoŋ
to bite	*tkiːr ~ *tkɛːr, *kat
black	*kmaw
blood	*ɟhaːm
boat	*duok
bone	*cʔəŋ
breast	*tɔh
to burn (vt.)	*tut, *ʔus
candle	*dian
claw/nail	*krcɔːk
cloud	*-(b/w)ɔːk
cold	*rŋaː(r)
to come/arrive	*mɔːk
die (of a person)	*slap
dog	*cɔː, *ckɛː
to drink (water)	*phik
dry (adj./stat.)	*praŋ
ear	*(t/c)rciək
earth/soil	*tiː
to eat	*cie
eye	*pnɛːk
fat/grease/oil	*klaɲ
feather	*slaːp
fire	*ʔus
fish (n.)	*triː
fly (v.)	*həːr
foot	*ɟəːŋ
full (vessel)	*beːɲ
give	*ʔoːj
good	*lʔɔː
green	*kciː
group	*buak
hair (of head)	*suk
hand	*təj
to hear/listen	*stap
heart	*klim
horn	*sneːŋ
I	*ʔaɲ
to kill	*psiət, *smlap
know	*cih, *sgal
leaf	*slik
to learn	*rian
to lie (down)	*tiek
liver	*tləːm
long	*wɛːŋ
louse (head)	*ciː
man/husband	*ɟmoːl
meat/flesh	*sac
moon	*khɛː
mountain/hill	*bnɔm, *duol
mouth	*mat
name	*ɟmɔh
neck	*kɔː
new	*tmiː
night	*jɔp
nose	*crmuh
not	*ʔət ~ *ʔɔt ~ *ʔit
oil	*prieŋ
one	*muoj
person/human	*ʔnak
rain	*pliəŋ
red	*krhɔːm
road, path	*gnlɔːŋ
root (of a tree)	*ris
round (object)	*wiel, *rwiəl, *rwɔŋ
sand	*ksac
see	*jɔl, *ghəːɲ
sit	*guj
skin	*spɛːk
sleep	*tiːk
small	*tic, *cmaːr
smoke (n.)	(?*psɛːɲ)
to offer	*ɟuon
to speak, say	*srtiː
to stand	*ɟhɔːr
star	*pkaːj
stone	*tmɔː
sun	*tŋaj
to swim	*hɛːl(?)
that (dist.)	*nɔh
this (prox.)	*nih
tongue	*ʔntaːt
tree	*ɟhəː
two	*bier
to walk, go	*təːr
warm/hot	*ktaw
water	*tɨk
white	*skuː, *sɔː
woman/wife	*knsaj, *kntaj

== Lexical innovations ==
Selected Khmeric lexical innovations:

Gloss	Proto-Austroasiatic	Old Khmer	Modern Khmer	Surin Khmer
‘fish’	*kaʔ	triː~treː	trəj	trɛj
‘chicken’	*ʔiər	–	moan	mɯan
‘dog’	*cɔːʔ	cʰkɛː	cʰkae	ʨkɛː

== See also ==
- Proto-Austroasiatic language
