= Siem Pang District =

Siem Pang សៀមប៉ាង Lao: ແສນປາງ(Saen pang)
- District (srok)
- Location in Cambodia
- Coordinates: 14°08′N 106°24′E
- Country: Cambodia
- Province: Stung Treng
- Time zone: +7
- Geocode: 1903

Siem Pang District is a district located in Stung Treng Province, in north-east Cambodia. The district includes part of Veun Sai-Siem Pang National Park. According to the 1998 census of Cambodia, it had a population of 13,517.

The Khmer Khe language is spoken in Siem Pang District.
