= Khmer language =

Austroasiatic language

Khmer
- Cambodian
- ភាសាខ្មែរ / Phiasa Khmae ខេមរភាសា / Khemărăphiasa
- Phiasa Khmae ('Khmer language') written in Khmer script
- Pronunciation: [pʰiə.ˈsaː kʰmae] [kʰeː.maʔ.raʔ.pʰiə.ˈsaː]
- Native to: Cambodia; Thailand (East and Isan); Vietnam (Mekong Delta and Southeast)
- Ethnicity: Khmer
- Speakers: L1: 19 million (2019); L2: 1 million (2024); Total: 21 million (2019–2024)
- Language family: Austroasiatic: Khmer
- Early forms: Proto-Khmeric: Old Khmer; Middle Khmer
- Writing system: Khmer script; Khmer Braille

Official status
- Official language in: Cambodia
- Recognised minority language in: Thailand; Vietnam
- Regulated by: Royal Academy of Cambodia, National Council of Khmer Language

Language codes
- ISO 639-1: km Central Khmer
- ISO 639-2: khm Central Khmer
- ISO 639-3: Either: khm – Khmer kxm – Northern Khmer
- Glottolog: khme1253 Khmeric cent1989 Central Khmer
- Linguasphere: 46-FBA-a
- Khmer

Khmer (/kəˈmɛər/ kə-MAIR; ខ្មែរ, UNGEGN: Khmae [kʰmae]) is an Austroasiatic language spoken natively by the Khmer people and is an official language and national language of Cambodia. The language is also widely spoken by Khmer people in Eastern Thailand and Isan, Thailand, as well as in the Southeastern and Mekong regions of Vietnam.

Khmer has been influenced considerably by Sanskrit and Pali especially in the royal and religious registers, through Hinduism and Buddhism, due to Old Khmer being the language of the historical empires of Chenla and Angkor.

The vast majority of Khmer speakers speak Central Khmer, the dialect of the central plain where the Khmer are most heavily concentrated. Within Cambodia, regional accents exist in remote areas but these are regarded as varieties of Central Khmer. Two exceptions are the speech of the capital, Phnom Penh, and that of the Khmer Khe in Stung Treng province, both of which differ sufficiently from Central Khmer to be considered separate dialects of Khmer.

Outside of Cambodia, three distinct dialects are spoken by ethnic Khmers native to areas that were historically part of the Khmer Empire. The Northern Khmer dialect is spoken by over a million Khmers in the southern regions of Northeast Thailand and is treated by some linguists as a separate language. Khmer Krom, or Southern Khmer, is the first language of the Khmer of Vietnam, while the Khmer living in the remote Cardamom Mountains speak a very conservative dialect that still displays features of the Middle Khmer language.

Khmer is primarily an analytic, isolating language. There are no inflections, conjugations or case endings. Instead, particles and auxiliary words are used to indicate grammatical relationships. General word order is subject–verb–object, and modifiers follow the word they modify. Classifiers appear after numbers when used to count nouns, though not always so consistently as in languages like Chinese. In spoken Khmer, topic-comment structure is common, and the perceived social relation between participants determines which sets of vocabulary, such as pronouns and honorifics, are proper.

Khmer differs from neighbouring languages such as Burmese, Thai, Lao, and Vietnamese in that it is not a tonal language. Words are stressed on the final syllable, hence many words conform to the typical Mon–Khmer pattern of a stressed syllable preceded by a minor syllable. The language has been written in the Khmer script, an abugida descended from the Brahmi script via the southern Indian Pallava script, since at least the 7th century. The script's form and use has evolved over the centuries; its modern features include subscripted versions of consonants used to write clusters and a division of consonants into two series with different inherent vowels.

== Classification ==
Khmer is a member of the Austroasiatic language family, the autochthonous family in an area that stretches from the Malay Peninsula through Southeast Asia to East India. Austroasiatic, which also includes Mon, Vietnamese and Munda, has been studied since 1856 and was first proposed as a language family in 1907. Despite the amount of research, there is still doubt about the internal relationship of the Austroasiatic languages.

Diffloth places Khmer in an eastern branch of the Mon-Khmer languages. In these classification schemes Khmer's closest genetic relatives are the Bahnaric and Pearic languages. More recent classifications doubt the validity of the Mon-Khmer sub-grouping and place the Khmer language as its own branch of Austroasiatic equidistant from the other 12 branches of the family.

== Geographic distribution and dialects ==
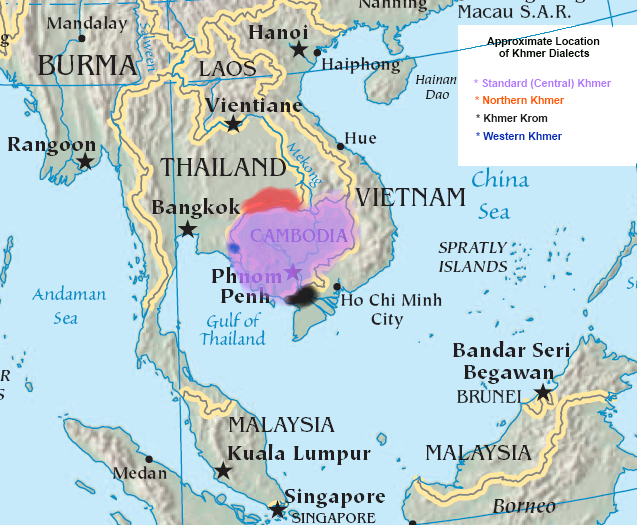
The approximate locations where various dialects of Khmer are spoken

Khmer is spoken by some 13 million people in Cambodia, where it is the official language. It is also a second language for most of the minority groups and indigenous hill tribes there. Additionally there are a million speakers of Khmer native to southern Vietnam (1999 census) and 1.4 million in east Thailand (2006).

Khmer dialects, although mutually intelligible, are sometimes quite marked. Notable variations are found in speakers from Phnom Penh (Cambodia's capital city), the rural Battambang area, the areas of Northeast Thailand adjacent to Cambodia such as Surin province, the Cardamom Mountains, and southern Vietnam. The dialects form a continuum running roughly north to south. Standard Cambodian Khmer is mutually intelligible with the others but a Khmer Krom speaker from Vietnam, for instance, may have great difficulty communicating with a Khmer native of Sisaket Province in Thailand.

The following is a classification scheme showing the development of the modern Khmer dialects.

- Middle Khmer
  - Cardamom (Western) Khmer
  - Central Khmer
    - Surin (Northern) Khmer
    - Standard Khmer and related dialects (including Khmer Krom)

A speaker of the Phnom Penh dialect of Khmer

Standard Khmer, or Central Khmer, the language as taught in Cambodian schools and used by the media, is based on the dialect spoken throughout the Central Plain, a region encompassed by the northwest and central provinces.

Northern Khmer (called Khmer Surin in Khmer) refers to the dialects spoken by many in several border provinces of present-day northeast Thailand. After the fall of the Khmer Empire in the early 15th century, the Dongrek Mountains served as a natural border leaving the Khmer north of the mountains under the sphere of influence of the Kingdom of Lan Xang. The conquests of Cambodia by Naresuan the Great for Ayutthaya furthered their political and economic isolation from Cambodia proper, leading to a dialect that developed relatively independently from the midpoint of the Middle Khmer period.

This has resulted in a distinct accent influenced by the surrounding tonal languages Lao and Thai, lexical differences, and phonemic differences in both vowels and distribution of consonants. Syllable-final /r/, which has become silent in other dialects of Khmer, is still pronounced in Northern Khmer. Some linguists classify Northern Khmer as a separate but closely related language rather than a dialect.

Western Khmer, also called Cardamom Khmer or Chanthaburi Khmer, is spoken by a very small, isolated population in the Cardamom mountain range extending from western Cambodia into eastern Central Thailand. Although little studied, this variety is unique in that it maintains a definite system of vocal register that has all but disappeared in other dialects of modern Khmer.

Phnom Penh Khmer is spoken in the capital and surrounding areas. This dialect is characterised by merging or complete elision of syllables, which speakers from other regions consider a "relaxed" pronunciation. For instance, "Phnom Penh" is sometimes shortened to "m'Penh". Another characteristic of Phnom Penh speech is observed in words with an "r" either as an initial consonant or as the second member of a consonant cluster (as in the English word "bread"). The "r", trilled or flapped in other dialects, is either pronounced as a uvular trill or not pronounced at all.

This alters the quality of any preceding consonant, causing a harder, more emphasised pronunciation. Another unique result is that the syllable is spoken with a low-rising or "dipping" tone much like the "hỏi" tone in Vietnamese. For example, some people pronounce ត្រី [trəj] ('fish') as [tʰəj]: the [r] is dropped and the vowel begins by dipping much lower in tone than standard speech and then rises, effectively doubling its length. Another example is the word រៀន [riən] ('to study'), which is pronounced [ʀiən], with the uvular "r" and the same intonation described above.

Khmer Krom or Southern Khmer is spoken by the indigenous Khmer population of the Mekong Delta, formerly controlled by the Khmer Empire but part of Vietnam since 1698. There have been reports of major restrictions by the Vietnamese government, as well as societal pressures, against usage of the Khmer language among the Khmer Krom, who, since the 1950s, have mostly (sometimes forcibly) taken on Vietnamese names.

Consequently, very little research has been published regarding this dialect, although conservation efforts have been underway, both in the form of education and state television. Khmer Krom has been generally influenced by Vietnamese for three centuries and accordingly displays a pronounced accent, tendency toward monosyllabic words and lexical differences from Standard Khmer.

Khmer Khe is spoken in the Se San, Srepok and Sekong river valleys of Sesan and Siem Pang districts in Stung Treng Province. Following the decline of Angkor, the Khmer abandoned their northern territories, which the Lao then settled. In the 17th century, Chey Chetha XI led a Khmer force into Stung Treng to retake the area. The Khmer Khe living in this area of Stung Treng in modern times are presumed to be the descendants of this group. Their dialect is thought to resemble that of pre-modern Siem Reap.

== Historical periods ==
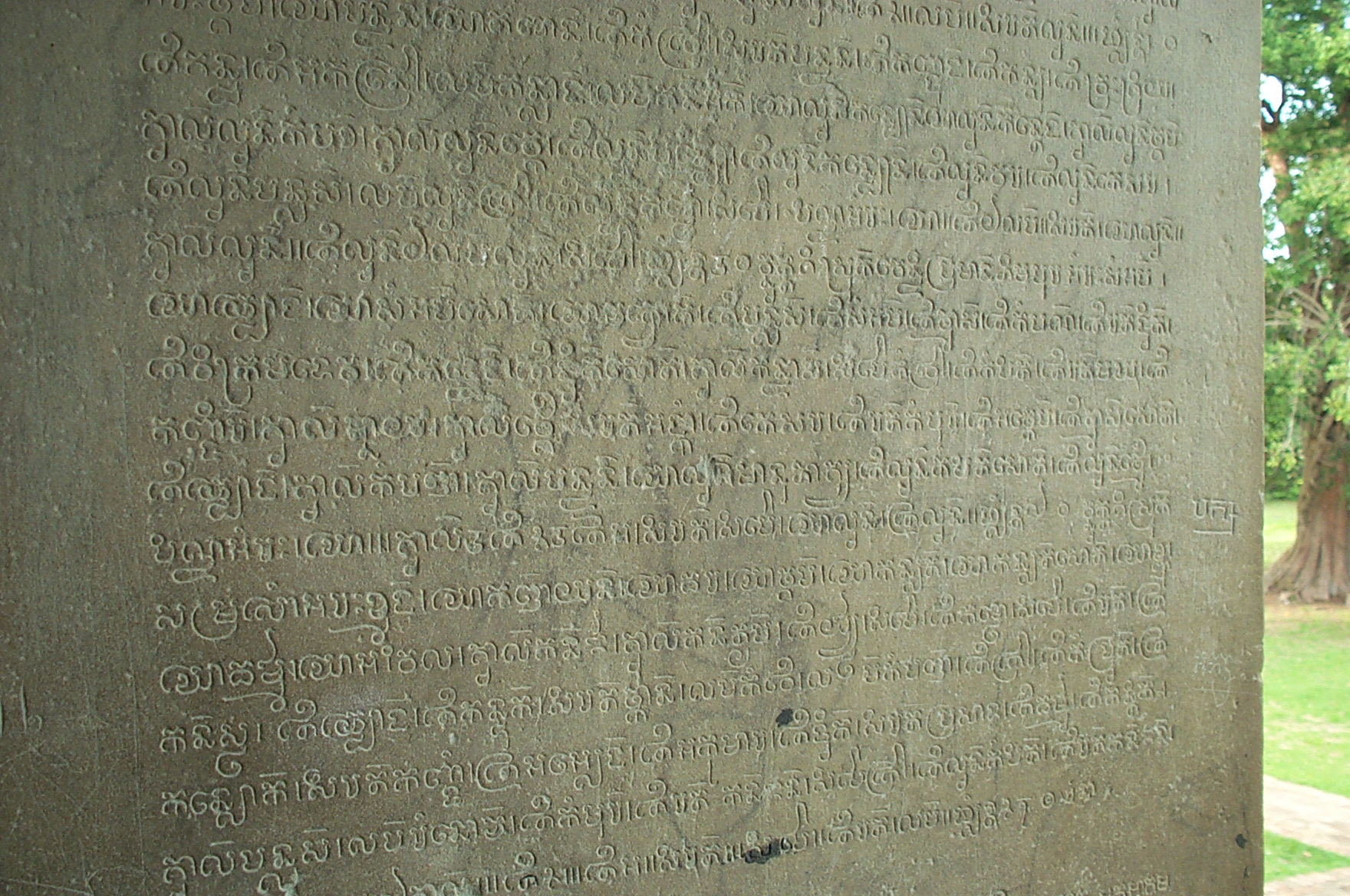
A stone carved in Old Khmer

Linguistic study of the Khmer language divides its history into three periods, one of which, the Old Khmer period, is subdivided into pre-Angkorian and Angkorian. Pre-Angkorian Khmer is the Old Khmer language from 600 through 800 CE. Angkorian Khmer is the language as it was spoken in the Khmer Empire from the 9th century until the 13th century.

The following centuries saw changes in morphology, phonology and lexicon. The language of this transition period, from about the 14th to 18th centuries, is referred to as Middle Khmer and saw borrowings from Thai in the literary register. Modern Khmer is dated from the 19th century to today.

The following table shows the conventionally accepted historical stages of Khmer.

Historical Stages of Khmer
Historical stage	Date
Pre- or Proto-Khmer	Before 600 CE
Pre-Angkorian Old Khmer	600–800
Angkorian Old Khmer	800 to mid-14th century
Middle Khmer	Mid-14th century to 18th century
Modern Khmer	1800–present

Just as modern Khmer was emerging from the transitional period represented by Middle Khmer, Cambodia fell under the influence of French colonialism. Thailand, which had for centuries claimed suzerainty over Cambodia and controlled succession to the Cambodian throne, began losing its influence on the language. In 1887 Cambodia was fully integrated into French Indochina, which brought in a French-speaking aristocracy. This led to French becoming the language of higher education and the intellectual class. By 1907, the French had wrested over half of modern-day Cambodia, including the north and northwest where Thai had been the prestige language, back from Thai control and reintegrated it into the country.

Many native scholars in the early 20th century, led by a monk named Chuon Nath, resisted the French and Thai influences on their language. Forming the government sponsored Cultural Committee to define and standardise the modern language, they championed Khmerisation, purging of foreign elements, reviving affixation, and the use of Old Khmer roots and historical Pali and Sanskrit to coin new words for modern ideas. Opponents, led by Keng Vannsak, who embraced "total Khmerisation" by denouncing the reversion to classical languages and favouring the use of contemporary colloquial Khmer for neologisms, and Ieu Koeus, who favoured borrowing from Thai, were also influential.

Koeus later joined the Cultural Committee and supported Nath. Nath's views and prolific work won out and he is credited with cultivating modern Khmer-language identity and culture, overseeing the translation of the entire Pali Buddhist canon into Khmer. He also created the modern Khmer language dictionary that is still in use today, helping preserve Khmer during the French colonial period.

== Phonology ==
The phonological system described here is the inventory of sounds of the standard spoken language, represented using the International Phonetic Alphabet (IPA).

=== Consonants ===
		Labial	Alveolar	Palatal	Velar	Glottal
Nasal		m ម៉, ម	n ណ, ន	ɲ ញ៉, ញ	ŋ ង៉, ង	
Plosive	aspirated	pʰ ផ, ភ	tʰ ឋ, ឍ, ថ, ធ	cʰ ឆ, ឈ	kʰ ខ, ឃ	
Plosive	voiceless	p ប៉, ព	t ត, ទ	c ច, ជ	k ក, គ	ʔ អ, អ៊
Plosive	voiced	ɓ ~ b ប, ប៊	ɗ ~ d ដ, ឌ			
Fricative			s ស, ស៊			h ~ ç ហ, ហ៊
Liquid	rhotic		r រ៉, រ			
Liquid	lateral		l ឡ, ល			
Approximant		ʋ ~ w វ៉, វ		j យ៉, យ		

The voiceless plosives /p/, /t/, /c/, /k/ may occur with or without aspiration (as [p] vs. [pʰ], etc.); this difference is contrastive before a vowel. However, the aspirated sounds in that position may be analysed as sequences of two phonemes: /pʰ/, /tʰ/, /cʰ/, /kʰ/. This analysis is supported by the fact that infixes can be inserted between the stop and the aspiration; for example [tʰom] ('big') becomes [tum.ˈhum] ('size') with a nominalising infix. When one of these plosives occurs initially before another consonant, aspiration is no longer contrastive and can be regarded as mere phonetic detail: slight aspiration is expected when the following consonant is not one of /ʔ/, /b/, /d/, /r/, /s/, /h/ (or /ŋ/ if the initial plosive is /k/).

The voiced plosives are pronounced as implosives [ɓ, ɗ] by most speakers, but this feature is weak in educated speech, where they become [b, d].

In syllable-final position, /h/ and /ʋ/ approach [ç] and [w] respectively. The stops /p/, /t/, /c/, /k/ are unaspirated and have no audible release when occurring as syllable finals.

In addition, the consonants /ɡ/, /f/, /ʃ/ and /z/ occur occasionally in recent loan words in the speech of Cambodians familiar with French and other languages.

=== Vowels ===
Various authors have proposed slightly different analyses of the Khmer vowel system. This may be in part because of the wide degree of variation in pronunciation between individual speakers, even within a dialectal region. The description below follows Huffman (1970). The number of vowel nuclei and their values vary between dialects; differences exist even between the Standard Khmer system and that of the Battambang dialect on which the standard is based.

Vowel diagram (monophthongs)

Monophthongs of Khmer
	Front		Central		Back	
	short	long	short	long	short	long
Close	i អ៊ិ	iː អ៊ី	ɨ អ៊ឹ	ɨː ~ ɯː អ៊ឺ	u អ៊ុ	uː អ៊ូ
Close-mid	e អិ	eː អេ	ə អឹ	əː ~ ɤː អឺ	o អុ	oː អូ, អ៊ោ
Open-mid		ɛː អ៊ែ				ɔː អ៊
Open	a អា់	aː អា			ɑ អ់	ɑː អ

Diphthongs of Khmer
	Front	Central	Back
high centering	iə អៀ, អ៊ា	ɨə អឿ	uə អួ
mid centering	eə អ៊ាក់		oə អ័រ
open centering	aə អើ		
mid closing	ei អី	əɨ~əw អ៊ៅ	
open closing	ai, ae អៃ, អែ	aɨ~aw អៅ	ao អោ

In addition, some diphthongs and triphthongs are analysed as a vowel nucleus plus a semivowel (/j/ or /w/) coda because they cannot be followed by a final consonant. These include: (with short monophthongs) /ɨw/, /əw/, /aj/, /aw/, /uj/; (with long monophthongs) /əːj/, /aːj/; (with long diphthongs) /iəj/, /iəw/, /ɨəj/, /aoj/, /aəj/ and /uəj/.

Independent vowels of Khmer
Khmer Vowels	IPA
ឥ	ʔe
ឦ	ʔej
ឧ	ʔu
ឩ	ʔuː
ឪ	ʔɜw, ʔɨw
ឫ	rɨ
ឬ	rɨː
ឭ	lɨ
ឮ	lɨː
ឯ	ʔae
ឰ	ʔaj
ឱ, ឲ	ʔao
ឳ	ʔaw

The independent vowels are a feature of the Khmer script: they are the vowel graphemes that can exist without a preceding or trailing written consonant. The independent vowels may be used as monosyllabic words, or as the initial syllables in longer words. Khmer words as written never begin with regular vowels; they can, however, begin with independent vowels. Example: ឰដ៏, ឧទាហរណ៍, ឧត្តម, ឱកាស...។

=== Syllable structure ===
A Khmer syllable begins with a single consonant, or else with a cluster of two, or rarely three, consonants. The only possible clusters of three consonants at the start of a syllable are /str/, /skr/, and (with aspirated consonants analysed as two-consonant sequences) /stʰ/, /lkʰ/. There are 85 possible two-consonant clusters (including [pʰ] etc. analysed as /ph/ etc.). All the clusters are shown in the following table, phonetically, i.e. superscript ʰ can mark either contrastive or non-contrastive aspiration (see above).

	p	ɓ	t	ɗ	c	k	ʔ	m	n	ɲ	ŋ	j	l	r	s	h	ʋ	t+h	k+h	t+r	k+r
p			pt-	pɗ-	pc-	pk-	pʔ-		pʰn-	pʰɲ-	pʰŋ-	pʰj-	pʰl-	pr-	ps-	pʰ-					
t	tp-	tɓ-				tk-	tʔ-	tʰm-	tʰn-		tʰŋ-	tʰj-	tʰl-	tr-		tʰ-	tʰʋ-				
c	cp-	cɓ-		cɗ-		ck-	cʔ-	cʰm-	cʰn-		cʰŋ-		cʰl-	cr-		cʰ-	cʰʋ-		cʰk-		
k	kp-	kɓ-	kt-	kɗ-	kc-		kʔ-	kʰm-	kʰn-	kʰɲ-	kŋ-	kʰj-	kʰl-	kr-	ks-	kʰ-	kʰʋ-				
s	sp-	sɓ-	st-	sɗ-		sk-	sʔ-	sm-	sn-	sɲ-	sŋ-		sl-	sr-			sʋ-	stʰ-		str-	skr-
ʔ																	ʔʋ-				
m			mt-	mɗ-	mc-		mʔ-		mn-	mɲ-		mj-	ml-	mr-	ms-	mh-					
l	lp-	lɓ-				lk-	lʔ-	lm-			lŋ-					lh-	lʋ-		lkʰ-		

Slight vowel epenthesis occurs in the clusters consisting of a plosive followed by /ʔ/, /b/, /d/, in those beginning /ʔ/, /m/, /l/, and in the cluster /kŋ-/.

After the initial consonant or consonant cluster comes the syllabic nucleus, which is one of the vowels listed above. This vowel may end the syllable or may be followed by a coda, which is a single consonant. If the syllable is stressed and the vowel is short, there must be a final consonant. All consonant sounds except /b/, /d/, /r/, /s/ and the aspirates can appear as the coda (although final /r/ is heard in some dialects, most notably in Northern Khmer).

A minor syllable (unstressed syllable preceding the main syllable of a word) has a structure of CV-, CrV-, CVN- or CrVN- (where C is a consonant, V a vowel, and N a nasal consonant). The vowels in such syllables are usually short; in conversation they may be reduced to [ə], although in careful or formal speech, including on television and radio, they are clearly articulated. An example of such a word is មនុស្ស mɔnuh, mɔnɨh, mĕəʾnuh ('person'), pronounced [mɔˈnuh], or more casually [məˈnuh].

=== Stress ===
Stress in Khmer falls on the final syllable of a word. Because of this predictable pattern, stress is non-phonemic in Khmer (it does not distinguish different meanings). Primary stress falls on the final syllable, with secondary stress on every second syllable from the end. Thus in a three-syllable word, the first syllable has secondary stress; in a four-syllable word, the second syllable has secondary stress; in a five-syllable word, the first and third syllables have secondary stress, and so on. Long polysyllables are not often used in conversation.

Most Khmer words consist of either one or two syllables. In most native disyllabic words, the first syllable is a minor (fully unstressed) syllable. Such words have been described as sesquisyllabic (i.e. as having one-and-a-half syllables). There are also some disyllabic words in which the first syllable does not behave as a minor syllable, but takes secondary stress. Most such words are compounds, but some are single morphemes (generally loanwords). An example is ភាសា ('language'), pronounced [ˌpʰiəˈsaː]. Words with three or more syllables, if they are not compounds, are mostly loanwords, usually derived from Pali, Sanskrit, or more recently, French. They are nonetheless adapted to Khmer stress patterns.

Compounds, however, preserve the stress patterns of the constituent words. Thus សំបុកចាប, the name of a kind of cookie (literally 'bird's nest'), is pronounced [sɑmˌbok ˈcaːp], with secondary stress on the second rather than the first syllable, because it is composed of the words [sɑmˈbok] ('nest') and [caːp] ('bird').

=== Phonation and tone ===
Khmer once had a phonation distinction in its vowels, but this now survives only in the most archaic dialect (Western Khmer). The distinction arose historically when vowels after Old Khmer voiced consonants became breathy voiced and diphthongised; for example *kaa, *ɡaa became *kaa, *ɡe̤a. When consonant voicing was lost, the distinction was maintained by the vowel (*kaa, *ke̤a); later the phonation disappeared as well ([kaː], [kiə]). These processes explain the origin of what are now called a-series and o-series consonants in the Khmer script.

Although most Cambodian dialects are not tonal, the colloquial Phnom Penh dialect has developed a tonal contrast (level versus peaking tone) as a by-product of the elision of /r/.

=== Intonation ===
Intonation often conveys semantic context in Khmer, as in distinguishing declarative statements, questions and exclamations. The available grammatical means of making such distinctions are not always used, or may be ambiguous; for example, the final interrogative particle ទេ /teː/ can also serve as an emphasising (or in some cases negating) particle.

The intonation pattern of a typical Khmer declarative phrase is a steady rise throughout followed by an abrupt drop on the last syllable.

ខ្ញុំមិនចង់បានទេ [↗kʰɲom mɨn cɑŋ baːn | ↘teː] ('I don't want it')

Other intonation contours signify a different type of phrase such as the "full doubt" interrogative, similar to yes–no questions in English. Full doubt interrogatives remain fairly even in tone throughout, but rise sharply towards the end.

អ្នកចង់ទៅលេងសៀមរាបទេ [↗neaʔ cɑŋ | ↗tɨw leːŋ siəm riəp | ꜛteː] ('do you want to go to Siem Reap?')

Exclamatory phrases follow the typical steadily rising pattern, but rise sharply on the last syllable instead of falling.

សៀវភៅនេះថ្លៃណាស់ [↗siəw pʰɨw nih | ↗tʰlaj | ꜛnah] ('this book is expensive!')

== Grammar ==
Khmer is primarily an analytic language with no inflection. Syntactic relations are mainly determined by word order. Old and Middle Khmer used particles to mark grammatical categories and many of these have survived in Modern Khmer but are used sparingly, mostly in literary or formal language. Khmer makes extensive use of auxiliary verbs, "directionals" and serial verb construction. Colloquial Khmer is a zero copula language, instead preferring predicative adjectives (and even predicative nouns) unless using a copula for emphasis or to avoid ambiguity in more complex sentences. Basic word order is subject–verb–object (SVO), although subjects are often dropped; prepositions are used rather than postpositions.

Topic-Comment constructions are common and the language is generally head-initial (modifiers follow the words they modify). Some grammatical processes are still not fully understood by western scholars. For example, it is not clear if certain features of Khmer grammar, such as actor nominalisation, should be treated as a morphological process or a purely syntactic device, and some derivational morphology seems "purely decorative" and performs no known syntactic work.

Lexical categories have been hard to define in Khmer. Henri Maspero, an early scholar of Khmer, claimed the language had no parts of speech, while a later scholar, Judith Jacob, posited four parts of speech and innumerable particles. John Haiman, on the other hand, identifies "a couple dozen" parts of speech in Khmer with the caveat that Khmer words have the freedom to perform a variety of syntactic functions depending on such factors as word order, relevant particles, location within a clause, intonation and context. Some of the more important lexical categories and their function are demonstrated in the following example sentence taken from a hospital brochure:

លោក អ្នក ផ្ដល់ ឈាម ទាំង អស់ ត្រូវ តែ ទទួល នៅ ការ ពិនិត្យ រាង កាយ និង ផ្ដល់ នៅ ប្រវត្តិ សុខភាព ចា មុន ចា សិន/
/loːk nĕəʔ pɗɑl cʰiəm teaŋ ʔɑh trəw tae tɔtuəl nəw kaː pinɨt riəŋ kaːj nɨŋ pʰɗɑl nəw prɑʋɔət sokʰapʰiəp ciə mun ciə sən/
you[RESP] you[FAM] {to provide} blood every all must {to have to} {to receive} {} {} {to examine} shape body and {to provide} {} history health {to be} before {to be} first
PN PN VERB NOUN PTCL ADJ AUX INT VERB OM NMLZ VERB NOUN NOUN CNJ VERB OM NOUN ADJ COP ADV COP ADV
'All blood donors must pass a physical examination and provide a health history first (before they can give blood).'

=== Morphology ===
Modern Khmer is an isolating language, which means that it uses little productive morphology. There is some derivation by means of prefixes and infixes, but this is a remnant of Old Khmer and not always productive in the modern language. Khmer morphology is evidence of a historical process through which the language was, at some point in the past, changed from being an agglutinative language to adopting an isolating typology. Affixed forms are lexicalised and cannot be used productively to form new words. Below are some of the most common affixes with examples as given by Huffman.

Type	Affix	Function	Word	Meaning	Affixed Word	Meaning
Prefix	p-	causative	ដាច់ [ɗac] ដើម [ɗaəm]	"broken, torn" "original, first"	ផ្ដាច់ [pɗac] ផ្ដើម [pɗaəm]	"to tear apart" "to start, begin (trans.)"
Prefix	ɓVN-, pVN-	causative	ដើរ [ɗaə] បែក [ɓaek] រៀន [riən]	"to walk" "to break (intrans.)" "to study, learn"	បណ្ដើរ [ɓɑn.ˈɗaə] បំបែក [ɓɑm.ˈɓaek] បង្រៀន [ɓɑŋ.ˈriən]	"to take for a walk" "to cause to break" "to teach"
Prefix	prV-	reciprocal	ខាំ [kʰam] ដូច [ɗouc]	"to bite" "similar"	ប្រខាំ [prɑ.kʰam] ប្រដូច [prɑ.ɗouc]	"to bite each other" "to compare"
Prefix	rV-	nominalised	បាំង [ɓaŋ] លត់ [lŭət]	"to hide" "to extinguish"	របាំង [rɔ.ˈɓaŋ] រលត់ [rɔ.ˈlŭət]	"barrier; a screen" "extinguished"
Prefix	(V)m-	instrumental	រស់ [rŭəh] ហូប [houp]	"to be alive; to live" "to eat"	អម្រស់ [ʔɑm.ˈrɑh] ម្ហូប [mhoup]	"job, profession" "food, meal"
Prefix	(c)VN-	instrumental	ដើរ [ɗaə] ពាក់ [pĕəʔ] ហូរ [hou]	"to walk" "to wear; to thread" "to flow"	អណ្ដើរ [ʔɑn.ˈɗaə] ចំពាក់ [cɑm.ˈpĕəʔ] ចង្ហូរ [cɑŋ.ˈhou]	"ladder, stairs" "bond, tie" "ditch; groove"
Infix	-Vm-	causative	ស្លាប់ [slap] ស្អាត [sʔaːt]	"to die" "to be clean"	សម្លាប់ [sɑm.ˈlap] សំអាត [sɑm.ˈʔaːt]	"to kill" "to clean"
Infix	-Vm(n)-	nominalised	ជឿ [cɨə] ដើរ [ɗaə] ដឹង[ɗəŋ]	"to believe" "to walk" "to know (something)"	ជំនឿ [cum.ˈnɨə] ដំណើរ [ɗɑm.ˈnaə] ដំណឹង [ɗɑm.ˈnəŋ]	"belief" "a trip, journey" "information"
Infix	-(rV)m-	agentive	ចាំ [cam] បាញ់ [ɓaɲ] ផឹក [pʰək]	"to wait; to watch over, guard" "to shoot (a bow or gun); hunt" "to drink"	ឆ្មាំ [cʰmam] ប្រមាញ់ [prɑ.ˈmaɲ] ប្រមឹក [prɑ.ˈmək]	"guard; watchman" "hunter" "drunkard, alcoholic"
Infix	-ɓ-	instrumental, resultative	ចាប់ [cap] រស់ [rŭəh] លេង [leiŋ]	"to grasp; to seize" "to be alive; to live" "to play, enjoy"	ច្បាប់ [cɓap] របស់ [rɔ.ˈɓɑh] ល្បែង [lɓaeŋ]	"law, rule" "thing, property; tool" "game"
Infix	-n-	locative, specializing	ចាំ [cam] ពាល់ [pŏəl]	"to wait; to watch over, guard" "to touch lightly"	ឆ្នាំ [cʰnam] ភ្នាល់ [phnŏəl]	"year (unit of time)" "to bet; to gamble"

Compounding in Khmer is a common derivational process that takes two forms, coordinate compounds and repetitive compounds. Coordinate compounds join two unbound morphemes (independent words) of similar meaning to form a compound signifying a concept more general than either word alone. Coordinate compounds join either two nouns or two verbs. Repetitive compounds, one of the most productive derivational features of Khmer, use reduplication of an entire word to derive words whose meaning depends on the class of the reduplicated word. A repetitive compound of a noun indicates plurality or generality while that of an adjectival verb could mean either an intensification or plurality.

Coordinate compounds:

ឪពុក {} ម្តាយ {} ឪពុកម្តាយ
[ʔəwpuk] + [mɗaːj] ⇒ [ʔəwpuk.mɗaːj]
father {} mother {} parents

ដឹក {} នាំ {} ដឹកនាំ
[ɗək] + [nɔəm] ⇒ [ɗək.nŏəm]
{to transport} {} {to bring} {} {to lead}

Repetitive compounds:

ឆាប់ {} ឆាប់ៗ
[cʰap] ⇒ [cʰap.cʰap]
fast {} {very fast, quickly}

ស្រី {} ស្រីៗ
[srəj] ⇒ [srəj.srəj]
women {} {women, women in general}

==== Nouns and pronouns ====
Khmer nouns do not inflect for grammatical gender or singular/plural. There are no articles, but indefiniteness is often expressed by the word for "one" (មួយ [muəj]) following the noun as in ឆ្កែមួយ ([cʰkae muəj] "a dog"). Plurality can be marked by postnominal particles, numerals, or reduplication of a following adjective, which, although similar to intensification, is usually not ambiguous due to context.

ឆ្កែ ច្រើន
[cʰkae craən]
dog many
"many dogs"

ឆ្កែ ពីរ
[cʰkae piː]
dog two
"two dogs"

ឆ្កែ ធំ ធំ
[cʰkae tʰom tʰom]
dog large large
'large dogs'

Classifying particles are used after numerals, but are not always obligatory as they are in Thai or Chinese, for example, and are often dropped in colloquial speech. Khmer nouns are divided into two groups: mass nouns, which take classifiers; and specific nouns, which do not. The overwhelming majority are mass nouns.

ខ្មៅដៃ ពីរ ដើម
[kʰmawɗaj piː ɗaəm]
pencil two {CLF [long cylindrical object]}
"two pencils"

Possession is colloquially expressed by word order. The possessor is placed after the thing that is possessed. Alternatively, in more complex sentences or when emphasis is required, a possessive construction using the word របស់ ([rɔːbɑh] ~ [lə.bɑh], "property, object") may be employed. In formal and literary contexts, the possessive particle នៃ ([nɨj]) is used:

ពួកម៉ាក ខ្ញុំ
[puəʔmaːʔ kʰɲom]
friend I
"my friend"

ពួកម៉ាក របស់ ខ្ញុំ
[puəʔmaːʔ rɔːɓɑh kʰɲom]
friend property I
"my friend"

ពួកម៉ាក នៃ ខ្ញុំ
[puəʔmaːʔ nɨj kʰɲom]
friend of I
"my friend"

Pronouns are subject to a complicated system of social register, the choice of pronoun depending on the perceived relationships between speaker, audience and referent (see Social registers below). Khmer exhibits pronoun avoidance, so kinship terms, nicknames and proper names are often used instead of pronouns (including for the first person) among intimates. Subject pronouns are frequently dropped in colloquial conversation.

Adjectives, verbs and verb phrases may be made into nouns by the use of nominalisation particles. Three of the more common particles used to create nouns are [kaː], [seckdəj], and [pʰiəp]. These particles are prefixed most often to verbs to form abstract nouns. The latter, derived from Sanskrit, also occurs as a suffix in fixed forms borrowed from Sanskrit and Pali such as [sokʰapʰiəp] ("health") from [sok] ("to be healthy").

ការ រស់នៅ
[kaː rŭəhnɨw]
NMLZ {to live}
'life'

សេចក្តី ដេក
[{seckdəj} deik]
NMLZ {to lie down}
'[the act of] lying down'

ភាព សមរម្យ
[pʰiəp {sɑːm rum'}]
NMLZ {to appropriate}
'appropriateness'

==== Adjectives and adverbs ====
Adjectives, demonstratives and numerals follow the noun they modify. Adverbs likewise follow the verb. Morphologically, adjectives and adverbs are not distinguished, with many words often serving either function. Adjectives are also employed as verbs as Khmer sentences rarely use a copula.

Degrees of comparison are constructed syntactically. Comparatives are expressed using the word ជាង /ciəŋ/: "A X /ciəŋ/ [B]" (A is more X [than B]). The most common way to express superlatives is with ជាងគេ /ciəŋ keː/: "A X /ciəŋ keː/" (A is the most X). Intensity is also expressed syntactically, similar to other languages of the region, by reduplication or with the use of intensifiers.

ស្រី នោះ ស្អាត
/srəj nuh sʔaːt/
girl DEM pretty
'That girl is pretty.'

ស្រី នោះ ស្អាត ស្អាត
/srəj nuh sʔaːt sʔaːt/
girl DEM pretty pretty
'That girl is very pretty.'

ស្រី នោះ ស្អាត ណាស់
/srəj nuh sʔaːt nah/
girl DEM pretty very
'That girl is very pretty.'

==== Verbs ====
As is typical of most East Asian languages, Khmer verbs do not inflect at all; tense, aspect and mood can be expressed using auxiliary verbs, particles (such as កំពុង /kəmpuŋ/, placed before a verb to express continuous aspect) and adverbs (such as "yesterday", "earlier", "tomorrow"), or may be understood from context. Serial verb construction is quite common.

Khmer verbs are a relatively open class and can be divided into two types, main verbs and auxiliary verbs. Huffman defined a Khmer verb as "any word that can be (negated)", and further divided main verbs into three classes.

Transitive verbs are verbs that may be followed by a direct object:

ខ្ញុំ ញ៉ាំ បាយ
/kʰɲom ɲam ɓaj/
I {to eat} rice
"I eat rice."

ខ្ញុំ ទិញ បារី
/kʰɲom tɨɲ ɓaːrəj/
I {to buy} cigarettes
"I buy cigarettes."

Intransitive verbs are verbs that can not be followed by an object:

ខ្ញុំ ដើរ ទៅ ផ្សារ
/kʰɲom ɗaə tɨw pʰsaː/
I {to walk} DIR market
"I walk to the market."

អញ្ជើញ អង្គុយ
/ʔaɲcəɲ ʔɑŋkuj/
{to invite} {to sit}
"Please sit."

Adjectival verbs are a word class that has no equivalent in English. When modifying a noun or verb, they function as adjectives or adverbs, respectively, but they may also be used as main verbs equivalent to English "be + adjective".

Adjective:

ប្រុស សង្ហា
/proh sɑŋ.haː/
boy handsome
"handsome boy"

Adverb:

ប្រុស នោះ ធ្វើការ ល្អ
/proh nuh {tʰʋəː kaː} lʔɑː/
boy DEM {to work} good
"That boy works well."

Verb:

ប្រុស នោះ សង្ហា
/proh nuh sɑŋ.haː/
boy DEM handsome
"That boy is handsome."

=== Syntax ===
Syntax is the rules and processes that describe how sentences are formed in a particular language, how words relate to each other within clauses or phrases and how those phrases relate to each other within a sentence to convey meaning. Khmer syntax is very analytic. Relationships between words and phrases are signified primarily by word order supplemented with auxiliary verbs and, particularly in formal and literary registers, grammatical marking particles. Grammatical phenomena such as negation and aspect are marked by particles while interrogative sentences are marked either by particles or interrogative words equivalent to English "wh-words".

A complete Khmer sentence consists of four basic elements—an optional topic, an optional subject, an obligatory predicate, and various adverbials and particles. The topic and subject are noun phrases, predicates are verb phrases and another noun phrase acting as an object or verbal attribute often follows the predicate.

==== Basic constituent order ====
When combining these noun and verb phrases into a sentence the order is typically SVO:

ខ្ញុំ ឲ្យ ចេក មួយ ចំនួន
/kʰɲom ʔaoj ceik muəj cɑmnuən/
I {to give} banana one bunch[CLF]
SBJ VERB OBJ {} {}
'I gave a bunch of bananas.'

When both a direct object and indirect object are present without any grammatical markers, the preferred order is SV(DO)(IO). In such a case, if the direct object phrase contains multiple components, the indirect object immediately follows the noun of the direct object phrase and the direct object's modifiers follow the indirect object:

ខ្ញុំ ឲ្យ ចេក ជ្រូក មួយ ចំនួន
/kʰɲom ʔaoj ceik cruːk muəj cɑmnuən/
I {to give} banana pig one bunch[CLF]
SBJ VERB DO IO {} {}
'I gave the pig a bunch of bananas.'

This ordering of objects can be changed and the meaning clarified with the inclusion of particles. The word /dɑl/, which normally means "to arrive" or "towards", can be used as a preposition meaning "to":

ខ្ញុំ ឲ្យ ចេក មួយ ចំនួន ដល់ ជ្រូក
/kʰɲom ʔaoj ceik muəj cɑmnuən dɑl cruːk/
I {to give} banana one bunch[CLF] toward pig
'I gave a bunch of bananas to the pigs.'

Alternatively, the indirect object could precede the direct object if the object-marking preposition /nəw/ were used:

ខ្ញុំ ឲ្យ ជ្រូក នៅ ចេក មួយ ចំនួន
/kʰɲom ʔaoj cruːk nəw ceik muəj cɑmnuən/
I {to give} pig OM banana one bunch[CLF]
'I gave the pig a bunch of bananas.'

However, in spoken discourse OSV is possible when emphasising the object in a topic–comment-like structure.

ទូក មួយ គង់ ប្រាំ អង្គ
/tuːk muəj kɔŋ pram ʔɑŋ/
boat one {to sit} five monk[CLF]
'In a boat sit five monks.'

វិជ្ជា ចោរ លួច មិន បាន
/ʋɪʔciə cao luəc mɨn baːn/
science thief {to steal} NEG COMPL
'Science, a thief can not steal.'

==== Noun phrase ====
The noun phrase in Khmer typically has the following structure:

Noun Phrase = (Honorific) Noun (Adjectival modifiers) (Numeral) (Classifier) (Demonstrative)

The elements in parentheses are optional. Honorifics are a class of words that serve to index the social status of the referent. Honorifics can be kinship terms or personal names, both of which are often used as first and second person pronouns, or specialised words such as /preah/ ('god') before royal and religious objects. The most common demonstratives are /nih/ ('this, these') and /nuh/ ('that, those'). The word /ae nuh/ ('those over there') has a more distal or vague connotation.

If the noun phrase contains a possessive adjective, it follows the noun and precedes the numeral. If a descriptive attribute co-occurs with a possessive, the possessive construction (/rɔbɑh/) is expected.

Some examples of typical Khmer noun phrases are:

ផ្ទះ ស្កឹមស្កៃ បី បួន ខ្នង នេះ
/ptĕəh skəm.skaj bəj buən kʰnɑːŋ nih/
house high three four spine[CLF] these
NOUN ADJ NUM NUM CLF DEM
'these three or four high houses'

ចេក ទុំ ពីរ ស្និត នេះ
/ceːk tum piː snət nih/
banana ripe two bunches[CLF] these
NOUN ADJ NUM CLF DEM
these two bunches of ripe bananas

ពួកម៉ាក ខ្ញុំ ពីរ នាក់ នេះ
/puəʔmaʔ kʰɲom piː nĕə nih/
friend I two person[CLF] these
NOUN POSS NUM CLF DEM
these two friends of mine

ពួកម៉ាក តូច របស់ ខ្ញុំ ពីរ នាក់ នេះ
/puəʔmaʔ touc rɔbɑh kʰɲom piː nĕə nih/
friend small of I two person[CLF] these
NOUN ADJ POSS POSS NUM CLF DEM
these two small friends of mine

The Khmer particle /dɑː/ marked attributes in Old Khmer noun phrases and is used in formal and literary language to signify that what precedes is the noun and what follows is the attribute. Modern usage may carry the connotation of mild intensity.

វាល ស្រែ ដ៏ {ល្វឹងល្វើយ}
/ʋiəl srae dɑː {lʋɨŋ lʋəːj}/
field paddy ADJ.MARKER vast
'(very) expansive fields and paddies'

==== Verb phrase ====
Khmer verbs are completely uninflected, and once a subject or topic has been introduced or is clear from context the noun phrase may be dropped. Thus, the simplest possible sentence in Khmer consists of a single verb. For example, /tɨw/ 'to go' on its own can mean "I'm going.", "He went.", "They've gone.", "Let's go.", etc. This also results in long strings of verbs such as:

ខ្ញុំ ចង់ ទៅ ដើរ លេង
/kʰɲom cɑng tɨw daə leːng/
I {to want} {to go} {to walk} {to play}
'I want to go for a stroll.'

Khmer uses three verbs for what translates into English as the copula. The general copula is /ciə/; it is used to convey identity with nominal predicates. For locative predicates, the copula is /nɨw/. The verb /miən/ is the "existential" copula meaning "there is" or "there exists".

ភាសា ចា ការ សម្ដែង ចិត្ត គំនិត គ្រប់ យ៉ាង
/pʰiəsaː ciə kaː sɑmdaeŋ cət kumnɨt krŏəp jaːŋ/
language copula NMLZ {to express} heart thought all kind
'Language is the expression of all emotions and ideas'

វា នៅ ជិត វត្ត
/ʋiə nɨw cɪt ʋŏət/
he copula close temple
'He is close to the temple.'

មាន ផែន ការ
/miən pʰaen kaː/
{to have} plan affair
'There is a plan.'

Negation is achieved by putting មិន /mɨn/ before the verb and the particle ទេ /teː/ at the end of the sentence or clause. In colloquial speech, verbs can also be negated without the need for a final particle, by placing ឥត /ʔɑt/~/ʔət/ before them.

ខ្ញុំ ជឿ
/kʰɲom cɨə/
I {to believe}
'I believe.'

ខ្ញុំ មិន ជឿ ទេ
/kʰɲom mɨn cɨə teː/
I NEG {to believe} NEG
'I don't believe.'

ខ្ញុំ អត់ ជឿ
/kʰɲom ʔɑt cɨə/
I NEG {to believe}
'I don't believe.'

Past tense can be conveyed by adverbs, such as "yesterday" or by the use of perfective particles such as /haəj/

គាត់ ទៅ ម្សិលមិញ
/kŏət tɨw msəlmɨɲ/
he {to go} yesterday
'He went yesterday.'

គាត់ ទៅ ហើយ
/kŏət tɨw haəj/
he {to go} pfv
'He left.' or 'He's already gone.'

Different senses of future action can also be expressed by the use of adverbs like "tomorrow" or by the future tense marker /nɨŋ/, which is placed immediately before the verb, or both:

ស្អែក ខ្ញុំ នឹង ទៅ {សាលារៀន}
/sʔaek kʰɲom nɨŋ tɨw {saːlaː riən}/
tomorrow I FUT {to go} school
'Tomorrow, I will go to school.'

Imperatives are often unmarked. For example, in addition to the meanings given above, the "sentence" /tɨw/ can also mean "Go!". Various words and particles may be added to the verb to soften the command to varying degrees, including to the point of politeness (jussives):

ចូ សាក ល្បង ខ្លួន ឯង ចុះ
/cou saːk lbɑːŋ kʰluən aeŋ coh/
IMP {to try} {to try} you REFL IMP
'Go ahead and try it yourself.'

សូម ធ្វើ តាម បណ្ដាំ គាត់ ទៅ
/soum tʰʋəː taːm bɑndam kŏət tɨw/
please {to do} {to follow} instruction he IMP
'Please follow his instructions.'

Prohibitives take the form "/kom/ + verb" and also are often softened by the addition of the particle /ʔəj/ to the end of the phrase.

កុំ នៅ ទី នេះ អី
/kom nɨw tiː nih ʔəj/
PROH {to be} place DEM COHORT
'Don't stay in this place.'

==== Questions ====
There are three basic types of questions in Khmer. Questions requesting specific information use question words. Polar questions are indicated with interrogative particles, most commonly /teː/, a homonym of the negation particle. Tag questions are indicated with various particles and rising inflection. The SVO word order is generally not inverted for questions.

លោក ទៅ ណា
/loːk tɨw naː/
you {to go} where
'Where are you going?'

លោក ស្ដាប់ បាន ទេ
/loːk sdap baːn teː/
you {to understand} modal Q
'Can you understand?'

លោក ទៅ ផ្សារ ហើយ ឬ នៅ
/loːk tɨw pʰsaː haəj rɨː nɨw/
you {to go} market PRF or yet
'Have you gone to the store yet?'

In more formal contexts and in polite speech, questions are also marked at their beginning by the particle /taə/.

តើ លោក អញ្ជើញ ទៅ ណា
/taə loːk ʔɑɲcəːɲ tɨw naː/
Q you {to invite} {to go} where
'Where are you going, sir?'

==== Passive voice ====
Khmer does not have a passive voice, but there is a construction utilising the main verb /trəw/ ("to hit", "to be correct", "to affect") as an auxiliary verb meaning "to be subject to" or "to undergo"—which results in sentences that are translated to English using the passive voice.

ពី ម្សិលមិញ ខ្ញុំ ត្រូវ ឆ្កែ ខាំ
/piː msəlmɨɲ kʰɲom trəw cʰkae kʰam/
from yesterday I {to undergo} dog {to bite}
'Yesterday I was bitten by a dog.'

==== Clause syntax ====
Complex sentences are formed in Khmer by the addition of one or more clauses to the main clause. The various types of clauses in Khmer include the coordinate clause, the relative clause and the subordinate clause. Word order in clauses is the same for that of the basic sentences described above. Coordinate clauses do not necessarily have to be marked; they can simply follow one another. When explicitly marked, they are joined by words similar to English conjunctions such as /nɨŋ/ ("and") and /haəj/ ("and then") or by clause-final conjunction-like adverbs /dae/ and /pʰɑːŋ/, both of which can mean "also" or "and also"; disjunction is indicated by /rɨː/ ("or").

Relative clauses can be introduced by /dael/ ("that") but, similar to coordinate clauses, often simply follow the main clause. For example, both phrases below can mean "the hospital bed that has wheels".

គ្រែ ពេទ្យ មាន កង់ រុញ
/krɛː pɛːt miən kɑŋ ruɲ/
bed hospital {to have} wheel {to push}
"the hospital bed that has wheels"

គ្រែ ពេទ្យ ដែល មាន កង់ រុញ
/krɛː pɛːt dael miən kɑŋ ruɲ/
bed hospital REL {to have} wheel {to push}
"the hospital bed that has wheels"

Relative clauses are more likely to be introduced with /dael/ if they do not immediately follow the head noun. Khmer subordinate conjunctions always precede a subordinate clause. Subordinate conjunctions include words such as /prŭəh/ ("because"), /hak bəj/ ("seems as if") and /daəmbəj/ ("in order to").

== Numerals ==
Counting in Khmer is based on a biquinary system: the numbers from 6 to 9 have the form "five one", "five two", etc. The words for multiples of ten from 30 to 90 are not related to the basic Khmer numbers, but are Chinese in origin, and probably came to Khmer via Thai. Khmer numerals, which were inherited directly from Indian numerals, are used more widely than Western numerals, which like Khmer numerals were inherited from Indian, but first passed through the Arabic numerals before reaching the west.

The principal number words are listed in the following table, which gives Western and Khmer digits, Khmer spelling and IPA transcription.

Value	Khmer	Word form	IPA	UNGEGN	Value	Khmer	Word form	IPA	UNGEGN
0	០	សូន្យ	/soːn/	sony					
1	១	មួយ	/muəj/	muŏy					
2	២	ពីរ	/piː/	pir	20	២០	ម្ភៃ	/mpʰɨj/, /məˈpʰɨj/	mphey
3	៣	បី	/ɓəj/	bei	30	៣០	សាមសិប	/saːmsəp/	samsĕp
4	៤	បួន	/ɓuən/	buŏn	40	៤០	សែសិប	/saesəp/	sêsĕp
5	៥	ប្រាំ	/pram/	prăm	50	៥០	ហាសិប	/haːsəp/	hasĕp
6	៦	ប្រាំមួយ	/prammuəj/	prămmuŏy	60	៦០	ហុកសិប	/hoksəp/	hŏksĕp
7	៧	ប្រាំពីរ	/prampiː/, /prampɨl/	prămpir	70	៧០	ចិតសិប	/cətsəp/	chĕtsĕp
8	៨	ប្រាំបី	/pramɓəj/	prămbei	80	៨០	ប៉ែតសិប	/paetsəp/	pêtsĕp
9	៩	ប្រាំបួន	/pramɓuən/	prămbuŏn	90	៩០	កៅសិប	/kawsəp/	kausĕp
10	១០	ដប់	/ɗɑp/	dáp	100	១០០	មួយរយ	/muəjrɔːj/	muŏy rôy

Intermediate numbers are formed by compounding the above elements. Powers of ten are denoted by loan words: រយ rôy /rɔːj/ (100), ពាន់ poăn /pŏən/ (1,000), ម៉ឺន mœn /məːn/ (10,000), សែន sên /saen/ (100,000) and លាន léan /liən/ (1,000,000) from Thai and កោដិ kaôt /kaot/ (10,000,000) from Sanskrit.

Ordinal numbers are formed by placing the particle ទី ti /tiː/ before the corresponding cardinal number.

== Social registers ==
Khmer employs a system of registers in which the speaker must always be conscious of the social status of the person spoken to. The different registers, which include those used for common speech, polite speech, speaking to or about royals and speaking to or about monks, employ alternate verbs, names of body parts and pronouns. As an example, the word for "to eat" used between intimates or in reference to animals is /siː/. Used in polite reference to commoners, it is /ɲam/. When used of those of higher social status, it is /pisa/ or /tɔtuəl tiən/. For monks the word is /cʰan/ and for royals, /saoj/. Another result is that the pronominal system is complex and full of honorific variations, just a few of which are shown in the table below.

Situational usage	I/me			you			he/she/it		
Intimate or addressing an inferior	អញ	ănh	[ʔaɲ]	ឯង	êng	[ʔaeŋ]	វា	véa	[ʋiə]
neutral	ខ្ញុំ	khnhŏm	[kʰɲom]	អ្នក	neăk	[neaʔ]	គេ	ké	[keː]
Formal	យើងខ្ញុំ, ខ្ញុំបាទ	yeung khnhŏm, khnhŏm bat	[jəːŋ kʰɲom] [kʰɲom ɓaːt]	លោក (or kinship term, title or rank)	lok	[loːk]	គាត់	koăt	[kɔət]
Layperson to/about Buddhist clergy	ខ្ញុំព្រះករុណា	khnhŏm preăh kârŭna	[kʰɲom preah karunaː]	ព្រះតេជព្រះគុណ	preăh déch preăh kŭn	[preah ɗaec preah kun]	ព្រះអង្គ	preăh ângk	[preah ʔɑŋ]
Buddhist clergy to layperson	អាត្មា, អាចក្តី	atma, ach kdei	[ʔatʰmaː], [ʔaːc kɗəj]	ញោមស្រី (to female) ញោមប្រុស (to male)	nhom srei (to female), nhom prŏs (to male)	[ɲoːm srəj] (to female), [ɲoːm proh] (to male)	ឧបាសក (to male), ឧបាសិកា (to female)	ŭbasâk (to male), ŭbasĕka	[ʔuɓaːsɑk] [ʔuɓaːsekaː]
when addressing royalty	ខ្ញុំព្រះបាទអម្ចាស់ or ទូលបង្គុំ (male), ខ្ញុំម្ចាស់ (female)	khnhŏm preăh bat âmchăs or tul bângkŏm (male), khnhŏm mchăs (female)	[kʰɲom preah ɓaːt ʔɑmcah] or [tuːl ɓɑŋkom] (male), [kʰɲom mcah] (female)	ព្រះករុណា	preăh kârŭna	[preah karunaː]	ទ្រង់	tróng	[trɔŋ]

== Writing system ==
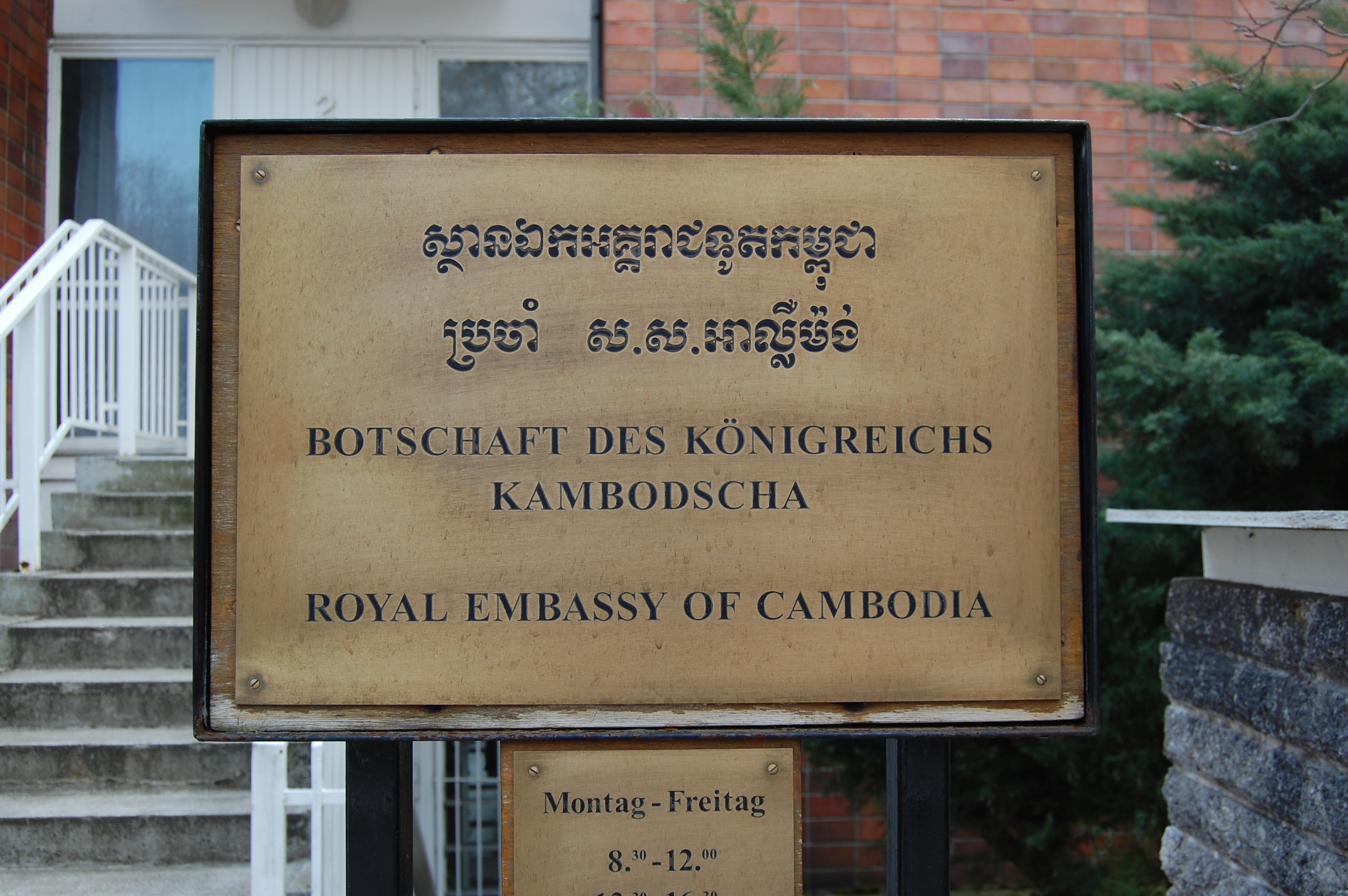
An example of modern Khmer script at the Cambodian Embassy in Berlin

Khmer is written with the Khmer script, an abugida developed from the Pallava script of India before the 7th century when the first known inscription appeared. Written left-to-right with vowel signs that can be placed after, before, above or below the consonant they follow, the Khmer script is similar in appearance and usage to Thai and Lao, both of which were based on the Khmer system. The Khmer script is also distantly related to the Mon–Burmese script. Within Cambodia, literacy in the Khmer alphabet is estimated at 77.6%.

Consonant symbols in Khmer are divided into two groups, or series. The first series carries the inherent vowel [ɑː] while the second series carries the inherent vowel [ɔː]. The Khmer names of the series, [akʰoːsaʔ] ('voiceless') and [kʰoːsaʔ] ('voiced'), respectively, indicate that the second series consonants were used to represent the voiced phonemes of Old Khmer. As the voicing of stops was lost, however, the contrast shifted to the phonation of the attached vowels, which, in turn, evolved into a simple difference of vowel quality, often by diphthongisation. This process has resulted in the Khmer alphabet having two symbols for most consonant phonemes and each vowel symbol having two possible readings, depending on the series of the initial consonant:

ត + ា	= តា	[taː]	'grandfather'
ទ + ា	= ទា	[tiə]	'duck'

== Examples ==
Reading the first article of the Universal Declaration of Human Rights in Khmer

The following text is from Article 1 of the Universal Declaration of Human Rights.

Khmer	មនុស្សទាំងអស់កើតមកមានសេរីភាពនិងភាពស្មើៗគ្នាក្នុងសិទ្ធិ និងសេចក្ដីថ្លៃថ្នូរ ។ មនុស្សគ្រប់រូបសុទ្ធតែមានវិចារណញ្ញាណនិងសតិសម្បជញ្ញៈ ហើយត្រូវប្រព្រឹត្ដចំពោះគ្នាទៅវិញទៅមកក្នុងស្មារតីរាប់អានគ្នាជាបងប្អូន ។
UNGEGN romanisation	Mônŭs teăng ás kaeut môk méan séreiphéap nĭng phéap smaeu-smaeu knéa knŏng sĕt, nĭng séchkdei thlaithnor. Mônŭs krôp rup sŏt tê méan vĭcharônânhéan nĭng sâtĕsâmpâchônhnheă, haeuy trov prâprœ̆t châmpoăh knéa tŏu vĭnh tŏu môk knŏng smarôdei roăp an knéa chéa bâng p'on.
IPA transcription	/mɔnuh tĕaŋ ɑh kaət̚ mɔː k̚ miən seː rəjpʰiəp̚ nɨŋ pʰiəp̚ smaəsmaə kniə knoŋ sət̚ nɨŋ seː c̚k̚ɗəj tʰlaj tʰnou. mɔnuh krup̚ ruː p̚ sot̚ tae miən vicaː ranaɲiən nɨŋ satəsampacŏəɲɲeaʔ haəj trouʋ prɑprɨt cɑmpŭəh kniə tɨw ʋɨɲ tɨw mɔː k̚ knoŋ smaː rɔː ɗəj rŏəp̚ ʔaː n kniə ciə ɓɑː ŋ pʔoun/.

== Khmer Languages Keyboard ==
Khmer language in computers

== See also ==
- Khmer literature
- Romanisation of Khmer
