= Khmer Khe dialect =

Khmer dialect of northeastern Cambodia

Khmer Khe
- Native to: Cambodia
- Region: Stung Treng Province
- Native speakers: ? (2013)
- Language family: Austroasiatic: Khmer; Khmer Khe

Language codes
- ISO 639-3: –
- Glottolog: None

Khmer Khe (or Hakka Khmer; Khmer: ខ្មែរខិ) is a Khmeric language spoken in Stung Treng Province, Cambodia. It has an estimated lexical similarity of between 95 and 96% with Central Khmer.

== Names ==
Alternate names for Khmer Khe include Khmer Khes and Khmer Kha-ak (Khmer Khak) (Herington & Ryan 2013:5).

== Distribution ==
Khmer Khe is spoken in the following villages of Siem Pang District, Stung Treng Province, Cambodia (Herington & Ryan 2013:8).

- Srae Sambour commune
  - Peam Khes
  - Kanhchanh Kouk / Kanhchanhkok
  - Srae Ruessei / Srae Ruessey
  - Kanhchanghterk / Kanhchanh Tuek / Kanhchangterk
  - Ket Mooeng / Ket Moeung
- Preak Meas commune
  - Khes Kraom
  - Khes Svay
  - Pong Kriel / Pongkriel
  - Tuol Kruos (part of Pong Kriel)
  - Kham Pouk
- Thma Keo commune
  - Nhang Sum / Nheang Sum
  - Mak Phoeung (part of Nhang Sum)
- Khe Thom village (location unknown)

Bahnaric languages are spoken to the east of the Khmer Khe area, and Kuy, a Katuic language, is spoken to the west.

== Phonology ==
=== Consonants ===
	Labial	Alveolar	Palatal	Velar	Glottal
Plosive	p (pʰ)	t (tʰ)	c (cʰ)	k (kʰ)	ʔ
Voiced plosive/Implosive	ɓ ~ b	ɗ ~ d	ɟ		
Nasal	m	n	ɲ	ŋ	
Liquid		r l			
Fricative	f (fʰ)	s			h
Approximant	w		j		

=== Vowels ===
Monophthongs of Khmer Khe
	Front		Central		Back	
	short	long	short	long	short	long
Close	i	iː	ɨ	ɨː	u	uː
Close-mid	e	eː	ə	əː	o	oː
Open-mid	ɛ	ɛː			ɔ	ɔː
Open	a	aː				
