= Old Khmer =

Oldest stage of the Khmer language

- Native to: Khmer Empire
- Region: Cambodia (in the lowlands) Vietnam (in the Mekong Delta) Thailand (attested in inscriptions from the Northeast, Central, and Southern Regions) Laos (attested from inscriptions in the South)
- Era: 7th to 15th century
- Language family: Austroasiatic: Khmeric; Old Khmer
- Early forms: Proto-Austroasiatic: Proto-Khmeric
- Writing system: Khmer, Pallava

Language codes
- ISO 639-3: okz
- Glottolog: oldk1249

Old Khmer is the oldest attested stage of the Khmer language, an Austroasiatic language historically and presently spoken across Cambodia, Southern Vietnam, and parts of Thailand and Laos. It is recorded in inscriptions dating from the early 7th century until the first few decades of the 15th century. Such inscriptions, spanning nearly a millennium and numbering well over a thousand, present one of the most extensive sources of documentation in Southeast Asia.

Old Khmer was written in an early variant of the Khmer script derived from Pallava, a southern variant of Brahmi, and in turn became the basis of the scripts used for Thai and Lao. Along with Brahmi and Indian influence on Cambodia, Old Khmer saw an influx of Sanskrit loanwords in the domains of religion, philosophy, and to a lesser extent, politics. Despite this, Old Khmer retained a prototypical Austroasiatic typology in phonology, syntax, and morphology, being sesquisyllabic, analytic, having a rich system of derivational affixes.

The language is customarily divided into Pre-Angkorian (611–802) and Angkorian (802–1431) stages based on both the date and the distribution of surviving inscriptions, with Pre-Angkorian inscriptions concentrated in the southern regions of Cambodia. After the abandonment of the sites of Angkor as the political centre of the Khmer-speaking polity, the practice of epigraphy decreased in the following centuries but did not disappear, persisting until the 20th century. However, inscriptions after the 15th century are customarily held to reflect the Middle Khmer stage of the language.

== Terminology ==
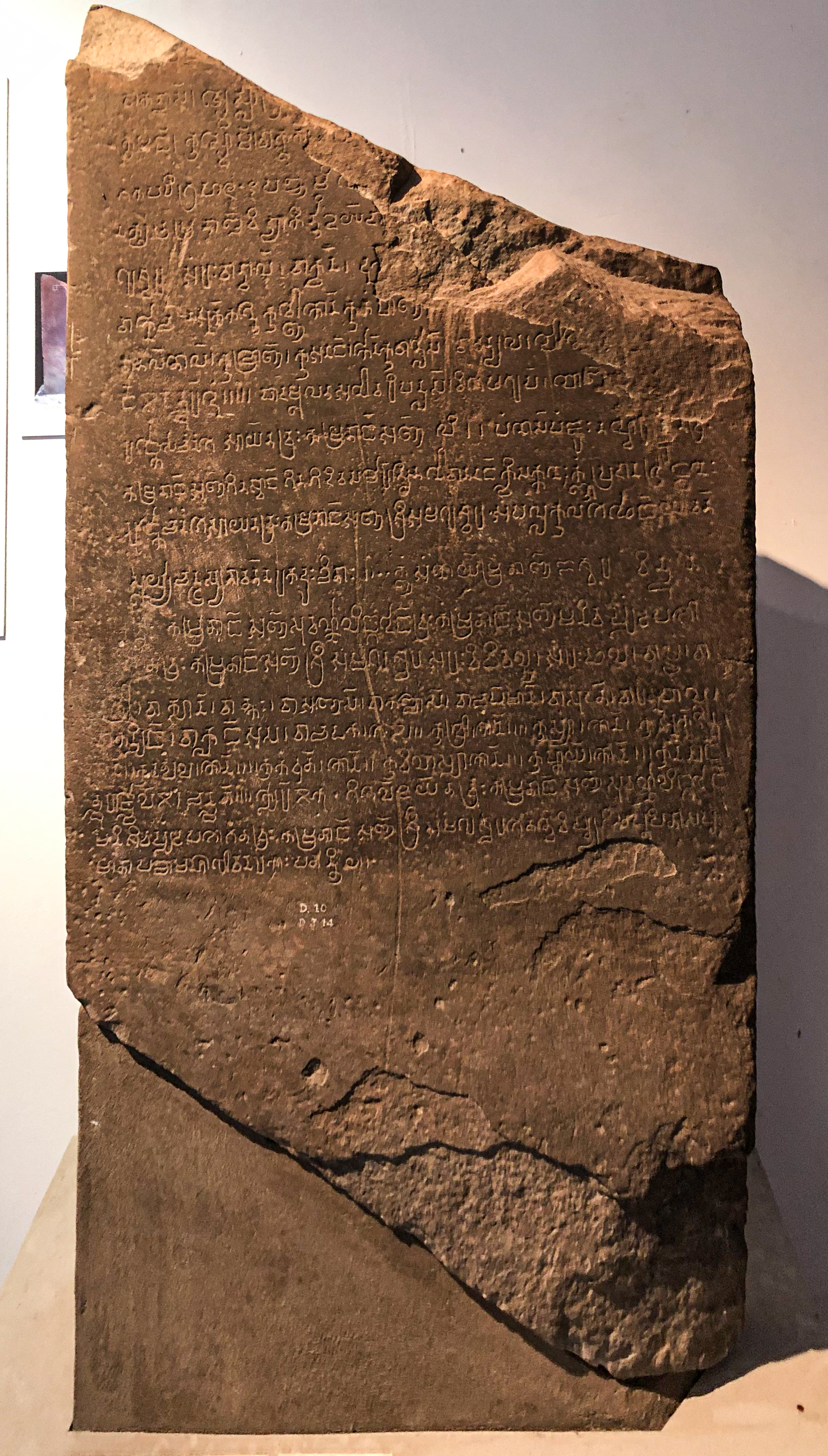
The Sambor Inscription, containing the earliest dateable usage of the numeral zero as a decimal value. Written in Old Khmer, it is dated to 683 CE, and describes a list of gifts donated to a temple. Found in Kratié province, Cambodia

As an endogenous term referring to the people and language, ក្មេរ៑ (kmér, /kmeː/) is attested in inscriptional lists specifying the ethnolinguistic affiliation of personnel attached to temples alongside terms for other ethnic groups, e.g. Mon, Chong, Bru. Its provenance is unknown, possibly deriving from mer "chief", "principal" or "mother".

== Attestation and history ==
Old Khmer entered into the historical period rather abruptly in 611, with all earlier inscriptions in present-day Cambodia and the Mekong Delta being written in Sanskrit. Even the earliest inscriptions, however, show a high degree of uniformity in orthography, suggesting a period of development prior to the first epigraphic attestation. Their contents, like later inscriptions, tend to concern legal matters such as land and property, donations to temples, and genealogies and lineages, suggesting a society already deeply entrenched in lower Cambodia. In terms of geography, the earliest inscriptions are concentrated in the southern parts of Cambodia and subsequent inscriptions show a south-to-north dispersal.

Due to the primarily legalistic nature of the inscriptions, the surviving corpus of Old Khmer represents only a partial picture of the language. Nonetheless, they provide important documentary evidence of the language's phonology, morphology, and syntax as well as clues about the natural and sociopolitical environments surrounding its speakers.

== Influences ==
Like other classical languages of Southeast Asia, Old Khmer was subject to heavy Sanskrit influence. This is especially evident in religious and philosophical concepts and in calendrical numerology, for which Khmer had no equivalents, but sometimes the choice of Sanskrit words over native equivalents were stylistic rather than necessary.

== Phonology ==
There is some ambiguity in sound and grapheme correspondence in Old Khmer. In particular, plain plosives /p/ and /t/ are not distinguished from implosive /ɓ/ and /ɗ/, both sets being represented by p and t respectively. Vowels, in particular, show a higher degree of ambiguity. Written a can represent /ɔ/, /ɔː/, /a/, and /aː/; ā can represent /a/, and /aː/; o can represent /oː/, /ɔ/ and /ɔː/; and e and ē, can represent /e/, /eː/, /ɛ/, /ɛː/, /ɤ/, and /ɤː/. Diphthongs /iːə/ and /uːə/ are represented by digraphs ya and va respectively.

Old Khmer onsets
		Labial	Alveolar	Palatal	Velar	Glottal
Plosive	plain	p	t	c	k	ʔ
Plosive	voiced	b	d	ɟ	ɡ	
Plosive	implosive	ɓ	ɗ			
Fricative			s			h
Nasal		m	n	ɲ	ŋ	
Approximant		w	l r	j		

Old Khmer codas
	Bilabial	Alveolar	Palatal	Velar	Glottal
Plosive	p	t	c	k	ʔ
Nasal	m	n	ɲ	ŋ	
Approximant	w	l	j		

=== Vowels ===
Old Khmer monophthongs
Height	Front	Central	Back
Close	ɪ iː	ɯː	ʊ uː
Close-mid	e eː	ɤ ɤː	o oː
Open-mid	ɛ ɛː	ɤ ɤː	ɔ ɔː
Open		a aː	

Long diphthongs	iːə	ɯːə	uːə
Short diphthongs	ɪə	ɯə	ʊə

- In open syllables, /uː/ and /oː/ may be realized as [ɯːw] and [ɤːw], respectively.

== Morphosyntax ==
=== Pronouns ===
Old Khmer has no attested second person proforms. Second person arguments were always referred to with titles, personal names, and kinship terms.

	singular	plural
1st person	ʔaɲ	jɤːŋ
3rd person	gɯː	geː
3rd diminutive	waː	

=== Numerals ===
	native	Sanskrit-derived
1	moːj ~ muːəj	ʔɛːk
2	beːr ~ biːər	doː ~ du̯aː
3	ɓiː	triː ~ trəjoː
4	ɓoːn ~ ɓuːən	cəɗʊr ~ catwariː
5	pram	ɓaɲ
6	pram moːj/muːəj	sat ~ sah
7	pram beːr/biːər	sapɗaː
8	pram ɓiː	ʔasɗaː
9	pram ɓoːn/ɓuːən	nɔːp
10	ɗɔp < Chinese *dzyip	dɔh

=== Classifiers ===
Classifier	Function
nak	people
sənrɛː/srɛː	ricefields
ɗɤːm	trees
ʔənlɤː	places
sat	beasts/animals

== Orthography ==
Pre-Angkorian (611–802) and Angkorian (802–1431) show minor differences in orthography, reflecting perhaps dialectal differences between the south and the north of the country or perhaps just differences in convention. These differences include representations of certain vowels and consonants.

== See also ==
- Khom
- Khmer inscriptions
- Middle Khmer
