= 1973 in North Vietnam =

- Decades: 1950s; 1960s; 1970s
- See also: Other events of 1973; Timeline of Vietnamese history

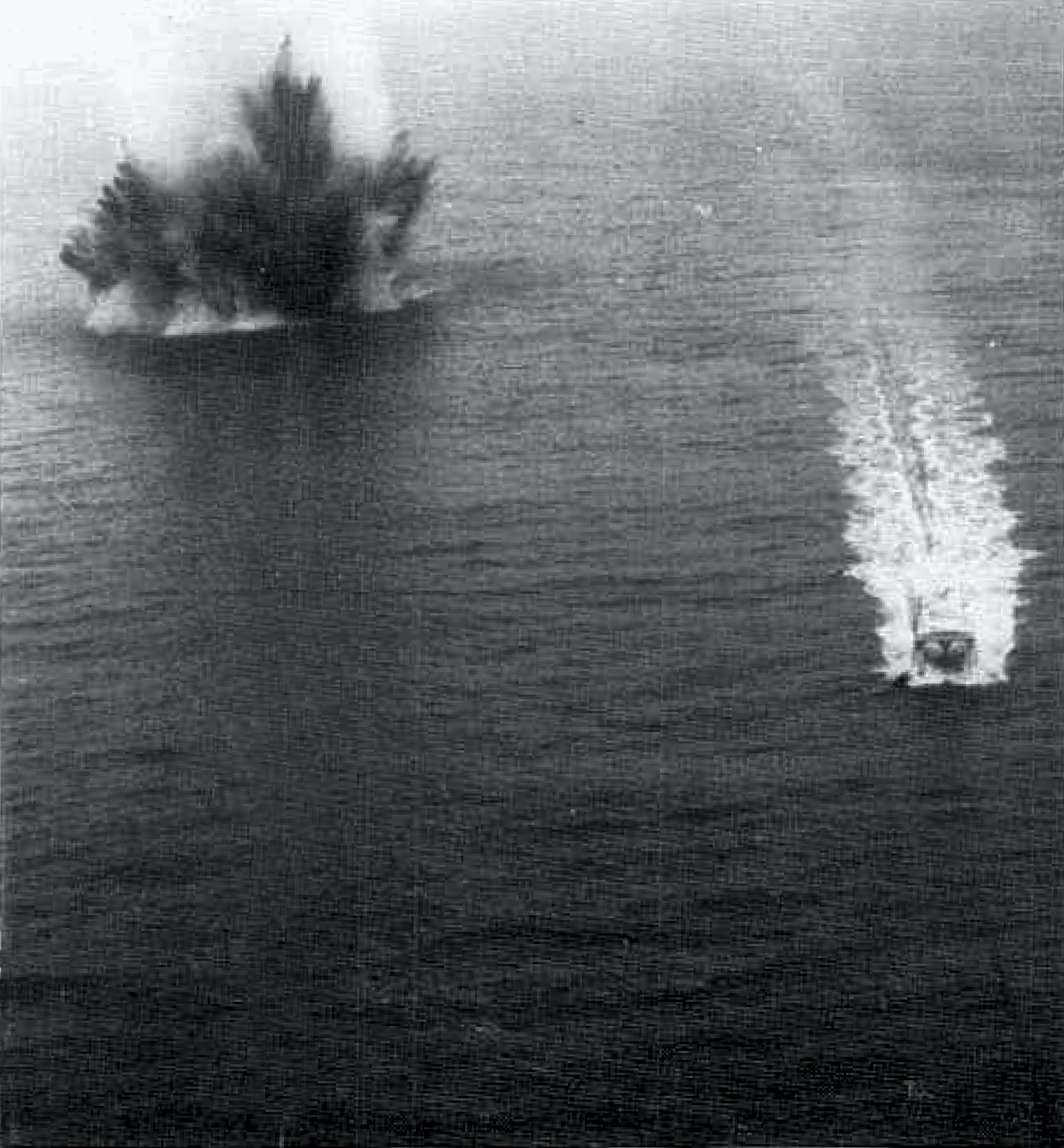
American naval mine explodes in Haiphong Harbor during Operation End Sweep

The following lists events that happened during 1973 in North Vietnam.

== Events ==
=== January ===
- January 15 - Citing progress in peace negotiations, U.S. President Richard Nixon announces the suspension of offensive action in North Vietnam.
