= Thánh Thiên =

Vietnamese princess and military leader

Lady Thánh Thiên
- Born: 12 February 10 AD
- Died: 30 August 43 AD
- Allegiance: Trưng sisters
- Battles / wars: Trưng sisters' rebellion

Thánh Thiên (10–43 AD) was a Vietnamese princess and military leader who took part in the Trưng sisters' rebellion against the Han Chinese from 40 AD to 43 AD.

== Biography ==
According to local legend, Thiên was born in the village of Bich Uyen in the modern day Hải Dương province. At a young age, she demonstrated martial prowess, beginning an uprising against the Han prefect called Tô Định. Her insurgency centered around the town of Ngọc Lâm, near the modern-day city of Bắc Giang, around which she oversaw the construction of workshops and military infrastructure. Thiên's army experienced initial success against the Han, but when she learned that the Trung sisters had issued a general call to rise up against the Chinese, she gathered her soldiers in order to join their cause. In the spring of 40 AD, the Trung sisters' rebellion was able to capture several Chinese settlements, and Thiên was proclaimed princess and given the position of general of the Hop Pho province in modern day Guangdong, China.

In 42 AD, the Han Chinese launched a counteroffensive led by Ma Yuan against the Trung sisters. Thiên and her army were stationed in Hop Pho and defended against the numerically superior Han forces. In the Battle of Hop Pho, Ma Yuan launched several attacks against Thiên which were repulsed, and was eventually forced to retreat to Ma Giang after Thiên counterattacked. Elsewhere, however, the forces of the Trung sisters were broken by the Han attacks. Thiên attempted to bring her forces south to come to their aid, but the Trung sisters already committed suicide in February of 42 AD. Thiên then fought and lost a battle at the Nhat Duc River; not wanting to be captured, she committed suicide.

== Legacy ==
After her death, Thánh Thiên became a part of Vietnamese folklore, and several poems were written about her exploits and skill as a general. Today, she is revered in her supposed hometown of Ngọc Lâm with a temple and a festival on 12 February, the day of her birth. There is also a street in the city of Bắc Giang which is named for her.
