= Hai Bà Trưng Temple =

Hai Bà Trưng Temple is the name of several temples to the Trưng sisters in Vietnam:

- Hai Bà Trưng Temple (Đồng Nhân), a temple in Hai Bà Trưng District, Hanoi
- Hai Bà Trưng Temple (Hạ Lôi), a temple in Mê Linh District, Hanoi (the sisters' homeland)
