= Copper columns of Ma Yuan =

1st-century CE columns

Copper columns of Ma Yuan (Vietnamese: Cột đồng Mã Viện) were a pair of copper columns erected by General Ma Yuan of Han China after his suppression of the Trưng sisters' rebellion in 43 CE. The columns stood at southern frontier of Tượng Lâm (Xianglin) to mark the boundary of Chinese territory against those the considered the barbarians. Ma prayed to the heaven: "If the copper columns break, Jiaozhi will be destroyed." (In Chinese, 銅柱折交趾滅, Tóng zhù zhé jiāozhǐ miè.) The location of the columns is unknown, with various explanations given for their disappearance. One popular story is that locals developed a superstitious habit of placing rocks to support the column as they passed and that, over time, this pile grew so large that it completely covered the columns. Another is that people threw rocks at the columns from hatred, destroying them. Later rationalist Chinese and Vietnamese scholars opined that it had probably simply fallen into the sea in the course of an earthquake or change of shoreline.

In 1272, Chinese Emperor Kublai Khan sent emissary Trần Thánh Tông to Vietnam to search for the columns. Tông reported the columns had long since disappeared and could no longer be found, abandoning the search.
