= Li Lao drum =

Type of musical instrument

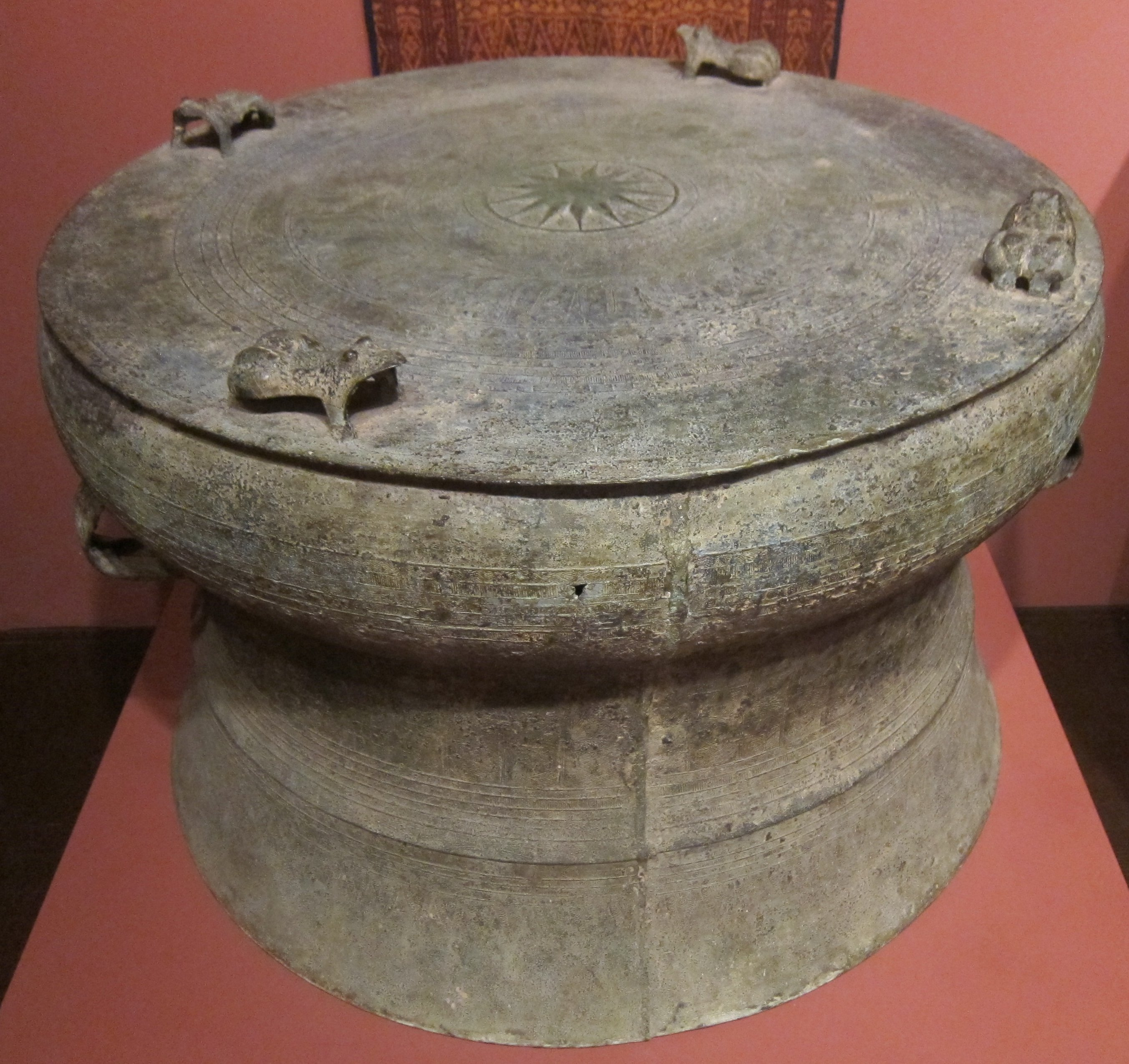
Example of Li-Lao drum, 4th century AD, Honolulu Museum of Art.

The Li-Lao bronze drums or Heger type II drums are a type of ancient bronze drums found in Southern China and Northern Vietnam invented and used by Tai-Kadai-speaking (or specifically Tai-speaking) ethnic groups who were known to Chinese as Lǐ (俚) or Lǎo (獠) and who historically inhabited the area between the Red River Delta and the Pearl River Delta from the 3rd to 8th century AD and later the Muong people, an ethnic minority in Northern Vietnam, from the 10th to 12th century. Classified by Franz Heger as type II to distinguish with the Dian-Dong Son drums or Heger type I, the Karen drum or Heger type III. Li-Lao drums were found in Guangdong, Guangxi, and northern Vietnam, particularly in the Muong hills.

The Li-Lao drums were known for unusual massive diameters and physical sizes. The biggest Li-Lao drum has a diameter of 150 cm (nearly double the size of the largest Dong Son drum). Despite that, decorations on Li-Lao drums are much lesser and impressive than their predecessor.

== History ==
The Li-Lao drums were produced and used by the Li people and flourishing Li-Lao culture in Southern China, between the Red River Delta of Vietnam and the Pearl River Delta in Guangdong, around ca. 200 AD to 750. Catherine Churchman geographically called them the People between two Rivers, i.e the Pearl River and the Red River.

It’s theorized by Michael and Catherine Churchman that the Li people began casting bronze drums around 40 AD, when according to Han dynasty sources, the Trung sisters’ revolt spread to Hepu (Guangxi) and sparked the local people to join the rebellion. Through this connection, the bronze drum manufacturing industry was transmitted from the Lac Viet to the Li. By 100 AD, while the Red River Delta no longer produced drums, in the Li homeland of Hepu, a new drum style and tradition was born.

Li-Lao drum culture flourished during the Six dynasties period of China and declined around the early Tang period. In 1902, Austrian archaeologist Franz Heger classified the Li-Lao drums as the Heger type II. He believed that the Li-Lao drums were descended from the Dian-Dongson drums.

== Usage ==
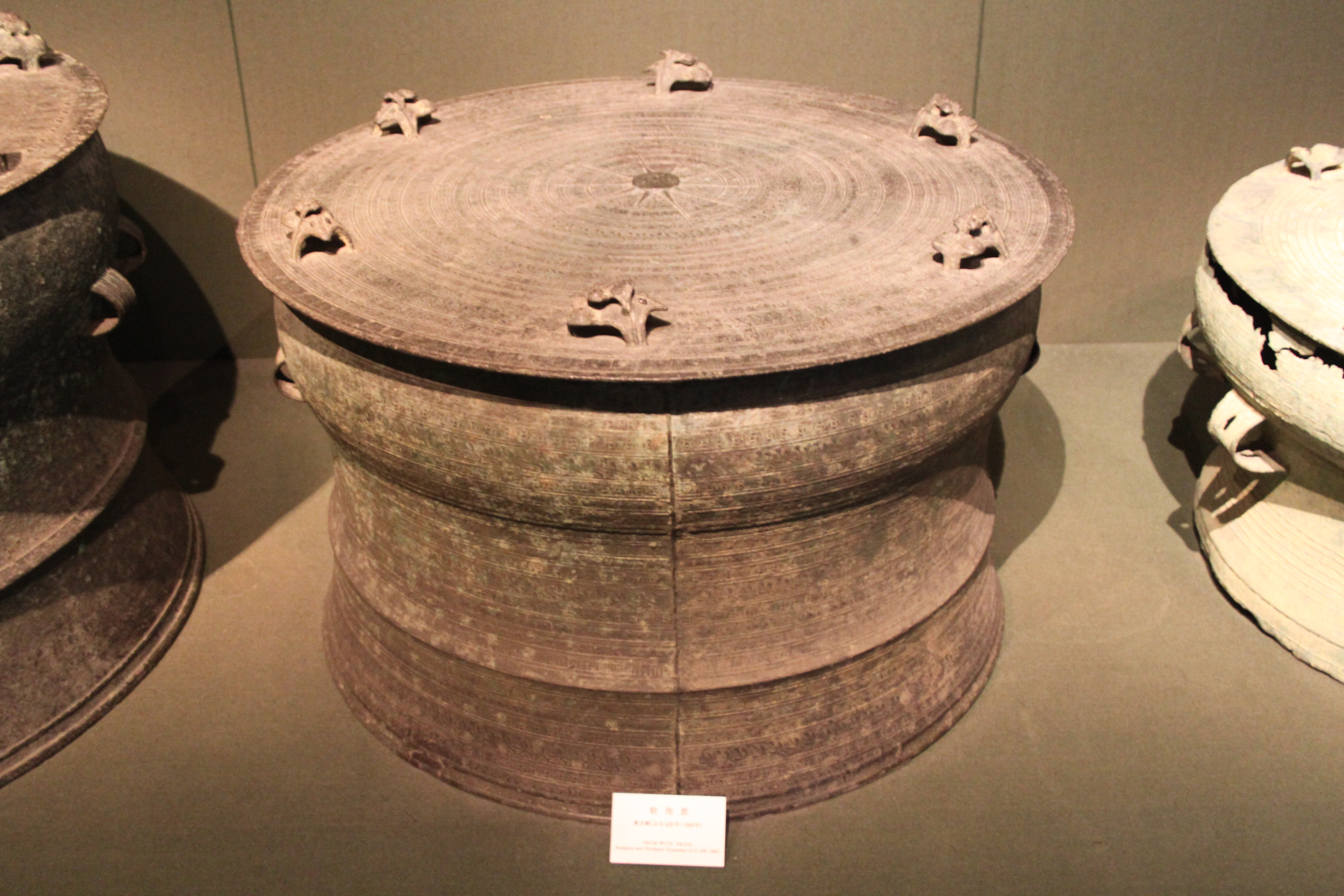
Li Lao drum, Southern and Northern dynasties period

The prosperity and autonomy society of the Li people, which mainly relied on the pearl trade, allowed them to cast numerous large drums. Because of its massive size, each Li-Lao drum weighs 150 kilograms would require double the number of copper ores (about 5,000 to 14,000 kilograms) and more labours to cast, compared to its Type I counterpart. In total, 215 type II drums are discovered in Guangxi and Guangdong.

Despite being sophisticated, the surfaces of Li-Lao drums are lesser in decorating, lack of detailed motifs that are identical to Heger I drums, such as mammals, birds, humans decorations, which creates a major difference between Heger type I drums and Li-Lao drums. Instead, they often carved geometric symbols on the surfaces, such as radiating sun, and sometimes, small toads. The handles are generally smaller and often (semi) circular. For centuries after that, bronze drums were highly symbolized as treasures of Li chieftains and to represent their nation's richness. The Li also brought bronze drums with them during battles and revolts against the Chinese.

"The Li and Lao value bronze drums highly, and consider only those which are more than a ZHANG (about 2.5 meters) across as especially unusual. When first completed they are hung up in the courtyards and on an appointed morning they set out wines and invite those of the same tribe. The guests crowd the gates, and the sons and daughters of the rich and prestigious people among the guests take gold and silver made into large forks and after beating on the drums with it they then leave it for the owner of the drum. These they call the "bronze drum forks" It is their custom to be fond of battle and they often make deadly enemies. When they wish to go to war against one another, they beat these drums to assemble their forces that arrive like the gathering of clouds. Those in possession of these drums are extremely powerful"

— Guangzhou Ji ~ 5th century.

The Sui Shu describes Lady Xian:

"...The Xian clan had for generations been leaders of the Nán Yuè. They stretched across the mountains and valleys, and their tribe comprised in excess of 100,000 families. They cut their hair and decorate their bodies, and they also cast bronze into large drums. When they sound these drums, people flood there…"

— Sui Annals, 636.

As late as the early 14th-century, Lê Tắc, a Đại Việt's official who had defected to the Yuan Mongol invaders, wrote in his 1335 Brief Records of Annam that bronze drums were forged, beaten, and valued by the Lǎozǐ (獠子), Tai-speakers as called by Chinese:

Lăozǐ, a different name for the Man. The majority of them live in Huguang and Yunnan; there are some who serve Jiaozhi; there are also some who tattoo their foreheads, who chisel their teeth; rather many kinds and groups. Also, there are the Tóuxíng Lăozǐ (Note: Ms. 頭形獠子; possibly a mistake for 飛頭獠子 Fēitóu Lăozǐ or 頭飛獠子 Tóufēi Lăozǐ "Flying Head Lăozǐ"), the red-shorts Lăozǐ, the nose-drinking Lăozǐ. They all live in caves on cliffs or huts or nests. They drink liquors using reeds' stems. They like to fight foes. They beat bronze drums; they consider the tall and big ones to be valuable. When a drum has just been finished, they display [it] at the center of the courtyard, arrange liquors, invite all from the same group to come and crowd the gate. Rich grandees' daughters will use hairpins made of gold & silver and tap on the drums; after they'll've been done tapping, they'll leave [the hairpins] to the [drum's] owner. Or it is said that the bronze drums are the gongs used by Zhuge Liang when conquering the Man.

— Lê Tắc, Brief Records of Annam, vol. 1, section "Borderers and Servants"

== See also ==
- Heger Type I drums
