= Phùng Thị Chính =

Vietnamese noblewoman

Phùng Thị Chính was a Vietnamese noblewoman who fought alongside the Trưng sisters in order to repel Han invaders from Vietnam in 43 CE. She was pregnant at the time, and was in charge of protecting the central flank. Legend says she gave birth on the front lines and carried her newborn in one arm and a sword in the other as she fought to open the ranks of the enemy.
