= Hai Bà Trưng Temple (Đồng Nhân) =

Temple in Hanoi, Vietnam

Coordinates: 21.012349°N 105.856785°E

The Hai Bà Trưng Temple is a place of worship in Hanoi near Hoàn Kiếm Lake. It is one of several temples to the two Trưng Sisters in Vietnam.

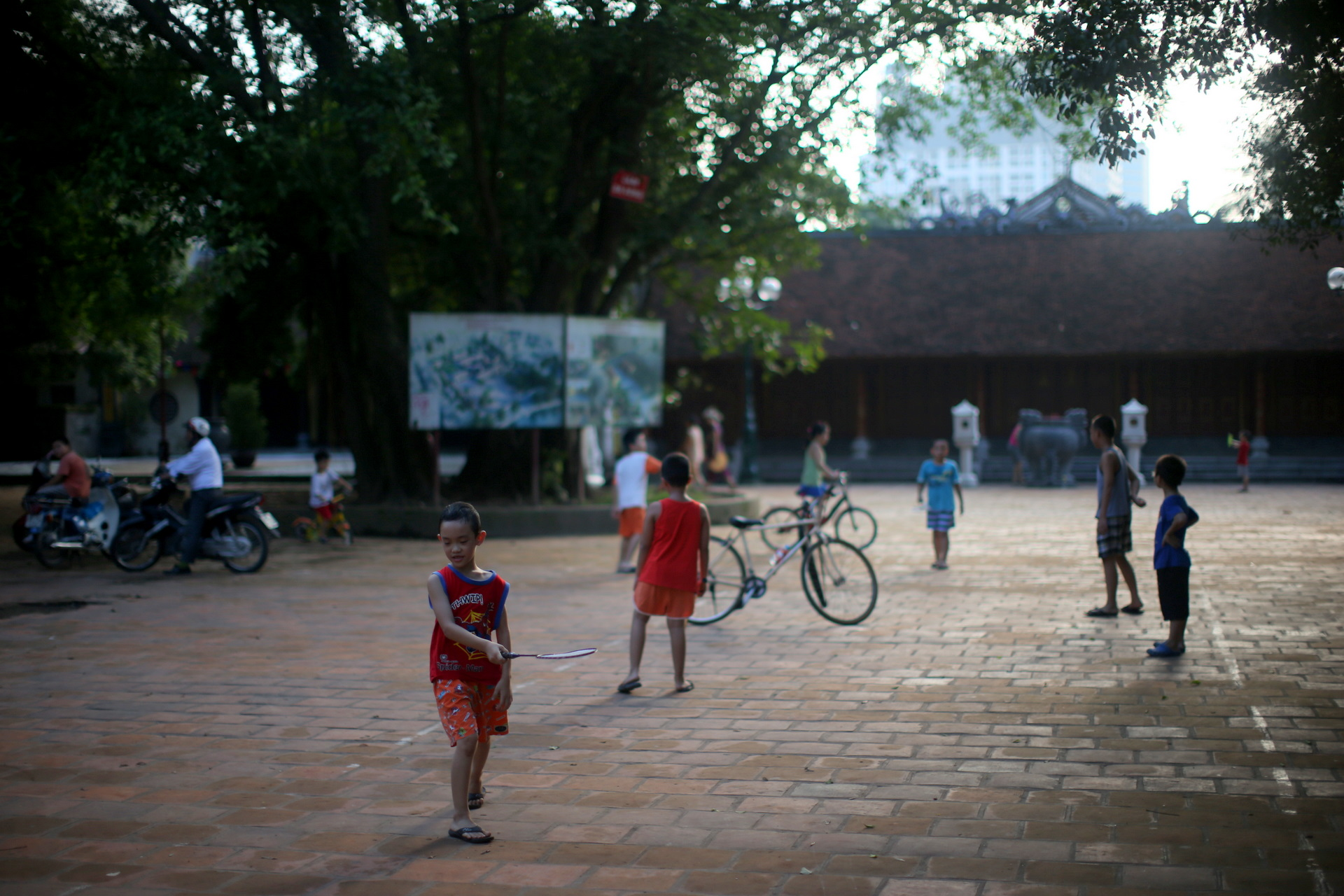
Kids playing in the Hai Bà Trưng Temple yard, Hanoi

According to tradition it was founded by Lý Anh Tông around 1160 after he visited a shrine to the Trưng Sisters, who then appeared to him as rain spirits. Culturally, the development of the cult of the sisters at that time is in the context of assertion of independence after the end of the Third Chinese domination of Vietnam - nearly 1000 years after the Qin conquest of Jiaozhi.

The altar display at the Trưng Sisters temple shows their violent death rather than suicide.
