= Jiaozhi =

Historical region in Vietnam

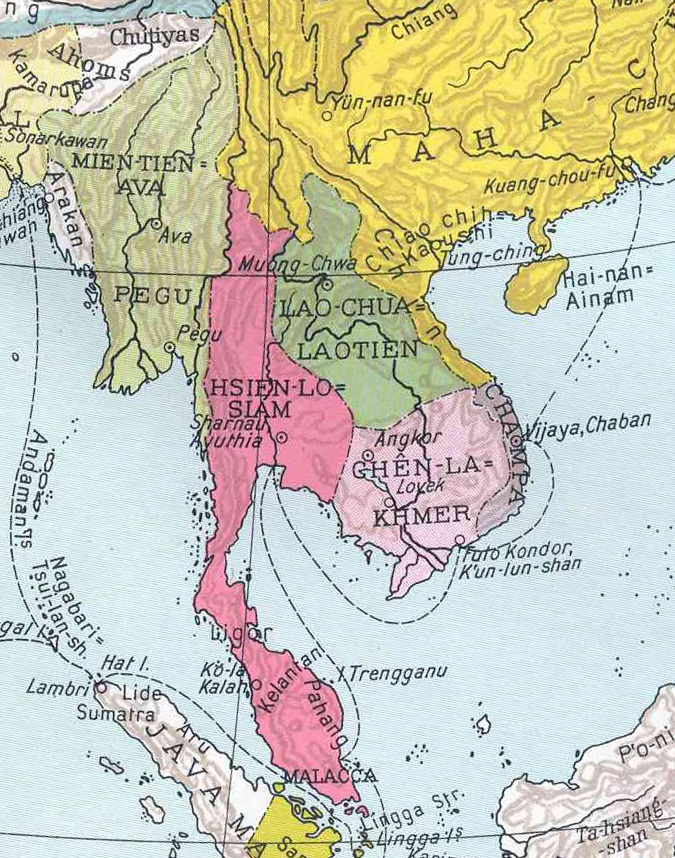
- 1415 map of Jiaozhi Province in northern Vietnam

Chinese name
- Chinese: 交趾
Transcriptions
Standard Mandarin
- Hanyu Pinyin: Jiāozhǐ
- Wade–Giles: Chiāo^{1}-chǐh^{4}
Middle Chinese
- Middle Chinese: *kˠau-t͡ɕɨX (ZS)
Old Chinese
- Baxter–Sagart (2014): *[k]ˁraw təʔ

Alternative Chinese name
- Chinese: 交阯
Transcriptions
Standard Mandarin
- Hanyu Pinyin: Jiāozhǐ
- Wade–Giles: Chiāo^{1}-chǐh^{4}

Vietnamese name
- Vietnamese alphabet: Giao Chỉ
- Chữ Hán: 交趾

History of Vietnam
(by names of Vietnam)
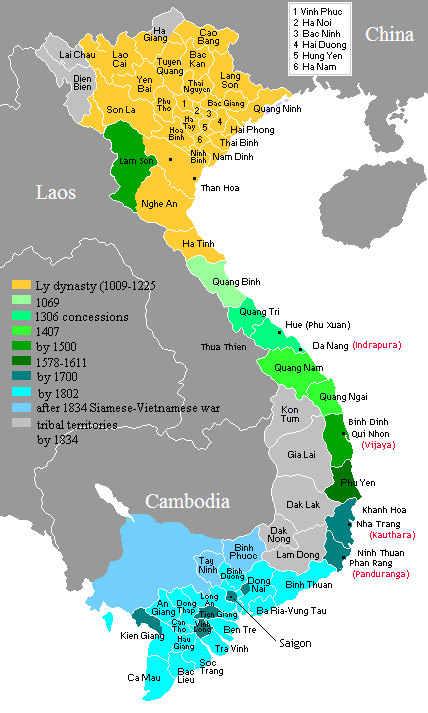

~2879–2524 BC	Xích Quỷ (Note: legendary)
~700–258 BC	Văn Lang
257–179 BC	Âu Lạc
204–111 BC	Nam Việt
111 BC – 40 AD	Giao Chỉ
40–43	Lĩnh Nam
43–203	Giao Chỉ
203–544	Giao Châu
544–602	Vạn Xuân
602–679	Giao Châu
679–757	An Nam
757–766	Trấn Nam
766–866	An Nam
866–968	Tĩnh Hải quân
968–1054	Đại Cồ Việt
1054–1400	Đại Việt
1400–1407	Đại Ngu
1407–1427	Giao Chỉ
1428–1804	Đại Việt
1804–1839	Việt Nam
1839–1945	Đại Nam
1887–1954	Đông Dương
1945–	Việt Nam
Main template
History of Vietnam

Jiaozhi (standard Chinese, pinyin: Jiāozhǐ, Vietnamese: Giao Chỉ), was a historical region ruled by various Chinese dynasties, corresponding to present-day northern Vietnam. The kingdom of Nanyue (204–111 BC) set up the Jiaozhi Commandery (Chinese: 交趾郡, 交阯郡; Vietnamese: Quận Giao Chỉ, chữ Hán: 郡交趾) an administrative division centered in the Red River Delta that existed through Vietnam's first and second periods of Chinese rule. During the Han dynasty, the commandery was part of a province of the same name (later renamed to Jiaozhou) that covered modern-day northern and central Vietnam as well as Guangdong and Guangxi in southern China. In 679 AD, Jiaozhi was absorbed into the Annan Protectorate established by the Tang dynasty. Afterwards, official use of the name Jiaozhi was superseded by "Annan" (Annam) and other names of Vietnam, except during the brief fourth period of Chinese rule when the Ming dynasty administered Vietnam as the Jiaozhi Province.

== Name ==
Chinese chroniclers assigned various folk etymologies for the toponym.

- In Book of Rites's subsection Royal Regulations, 交趾 was used to describe the physical characteristics of Nanman - southern neighbours of the Zhou. Late Eastern Han scholar Zheng Xuan (127 – c. 200 CE) interpreted 交趾 as "the appearance of feet turning in towards each other". 交趾 was subsequently translated as either "feet turned in towards each other" (James Legge) or "toes... crossed" (James M. Hargett).
- Book of Later Han also quoted the same passage from Book of Rites yet gave 交趾's etymology as: "[According to] their customs, men and women bathe in the same river; hence the appellation Jiāozhǐ".
- Tang period's encyclopedia Tongdian also stated that: "The southernmost people [have] tattooed foreheads (題額) and intersecting toes (交趾); [according to] their customs, men and women bathe in the same river. [By] tattooed foreheads (題額) it means they engrave their flesh with blue/green dye; [by] crossed toes (交趾), it means that each foot's big toe is spread widely outwards and crosses one another when [a person] stands [with feet] side-by-side."
- Song period's encyclopaedia Taiping Yulan quoted Ying Shao's "Han Officials' Etiquettes" that "Emperor Xiaowu leveled the Hundred Yue in the South [...] established Jiaozhi (交阯); [...] [People] started out in the North, then crossed (交 jiāo) at the South, for their descendants [they laid their] basis (jī 基) & foundation (zhǐ 阯) [there]".

A research based on historic record and petroglyph suggests the name Jiaozhi originated from Lingnan Yue people's ceremonial sitting posture of "sitting cross-legged" during sacrifices and other important occasions.

According to Michel Ferlus, the Sino-Vietnamese Jiao in Jiāozhǐ (交趾), together with the ethnonym and autonym of the Lao people (lǎo 獠), and the ethnonym Gēlǎo (仡佬), a Kra population scattered from Guizhou (China) to North Vietnam, would have emerged from *k(ə)ra:w. The etymon *k(ə)ra:w would have also yielded the ethnonym Keo/ Kæw kɛːw^{A1}, a name given to the Vietnamese by Tai speaking peoples, currently slightly derogatory. In Pupeo (Kra branch), kew is used to name the Tay (Central Tai) of North Vietnam.

jiāo 交 < MC kæw < OC *kraw [k.raw]

lǎo 獠 < MC lawX < OC *C-rawʔ [C.rawˀ]

Frederic Pain proposes that *k(ə)ra:w means 'human being' and originates from Austroasiatic: he further links it to a local root *trawʔ (Note: as reconstructed up to Proto-Mon-Khmer level by Harry Leonard Shorto; Sidwell (2024:xx) reconstructs *sroʔ), which is associated with taro, is ancestral to various Austroasiatic lexical items such as "Monic (Spoken Mon krao or Nyah-kur traw), Palaungic (Tung-wa kraɷʔ or Sem klao), or Katuic (Ong raw or Souei ʰraw < proto-Katuic *craw)", and possibly evoked "a particular (most probably tuber-based) cultivation practice used by small Mon-Khmer horticultural communities—as opposed to more complex and advanced cereal-growing (probably rice-based) societies"

Meanwhile, James Chamberlain claims that Jiao originated from a word also ancestral to Lao, thus meaning Jiao & Lao are cognates. Chamberlain, like Joachim Schlesinger, claim that the Vietnamese language was not originally based in the area of the Red River in what is now northern Vietnam. According to them, the Red River Delta region was originally inhabited by Tai-speakers. They claim that the area become Vietnamese-speaking only between the seventh and ninth centuries AD, or even as late as the tenth century, as a result of immigration from the south, i.e., modern north-central Vietnam. According to Han-Tang records, east of Jiaozhi and the coast of Guangdong, Guangxi was populated by Tai-Kadai speakers (whom Chinese contemporaries called Lǐ 俚 and Lǎo 獠). Catherine Churchman proposes that the Chinese character 獠 transliterated a native term and was shortened from older two-character combinations (which were used transcribe the endonym's initial consonantal cluster); noting that the older two-character combinations 鳩獠 Qiūlǎo, 狐獠 Húlǎo, and 屈獠 Qūlǎo had been pronounced *kɔ-lawʔ, *ɣɔ-lawʔ, and *kʰut-lawʔ respectively in Middle Chinese, she reconstructs the endonym *klao, which is either related to the word klao, meaning "person", in the Kra languages, or is a compound, meaning "our people", of prefix k- for "people" and Proto-Tai first person plural pronoun *rəu (Note: Pittayaporn (2009:358, 386) reconstructs *rawᴬ) "we, us". Even so, Michael Churchman acknowledged that "The absence of records of large-scale population shifts indicates that there was a fairly stable group of people in Jiaozhi throughout the Han–Tang period who spoke Austroasiatic languages ancestral to modern Vietnamese."

Jiaozhi, pronounced Kuchi in the Malay, became the Cochin-China of the Portuguese traders c. 1516, who so named it to distinguish it from the city and the Kingdom of Cochin in India, their first headquarters in the Malabar Coast. It was subsequently called "Cochinchina".

== History ==
=== Early mentions ===
Numerous Chinese sources, dated to the Spring & Autumn and Warring States periods, mentioned a place called Jiao(zhi) to the south of Ancient China. Book of Rites is the earliest extant source to associate the name Jiaozhi with the Nanman. However, Vietnamese historian Đào Duy Anh locates Jiaozhi (which was mentioned in ancient texts) only south of Mount Heng (衡山) (aka 霍山 Mount Huo or 天柱山 Mount Tianzhu), within the lower part of Yangtze's drainage basin, and nowhere farther than today Anhui province in China (i.e. not in today northern Vietnam); accordingly, Đào defines Jiao(zhi) as "lands in the south which bordered [ancient Chinese's] territories".

=== Van Lang ===
The native state of Văn Lang is not well attested, but much later sources name Giao Chỉ as one of the realm's districts (bộ). Its territory purportedly comprised present-day Hanoi and the land on the right bank of the Red River. According to tradition, the Hung kings directly ruled Mê Linh while other areas were ruled by dependent Lac lords. The Van Lang kingdom fell to the Âu under prince Thục Phán around 258 BC.

=== Âu Lạc ===
Thục Phán established his capital at Co Loa in Hanoi's Dong Anh district. The citadel was taken around 208 BC by the Qin general Zhao Tuo.

=== Nanyue ===
Zhao Tuo declared his independent kingdom of Nanyue in 204 and organized his Vietnamese territory as the two commanderies of Jiaozhi and Jiuzhen (Vietnamese: Cửu Chân; present-day Thanh Hóa, Nghệ An, and Hà Tĩnh). Following a native coup that killed the Zhao king and his Chinese mother, the Han launched two invasions in 112 and 111 BC that razed the Nanyue capital at Panyu (Guangzhou). When Han dynasty conquered Nanyue in 111 BC, the Han court divided it into 9 commanderies, one commandery called Jiaozhi was the center of Han administration and government for all 9 areas. Because of this, the entire areas of 9 commanderies was sometime called Jiaozhi. From Han to Tang, the names Jiaozhi and Jiao county at least was used for a part of the Han-era Jiaozhi. In 670, Jiaozhi was absorbed into a larger administrative called Annan (Pacified South). After this, the name Jiaozhi was applied for the Red River Delta and most or all of northern Vietnam (Tonkin).

=== Han dynasty ===
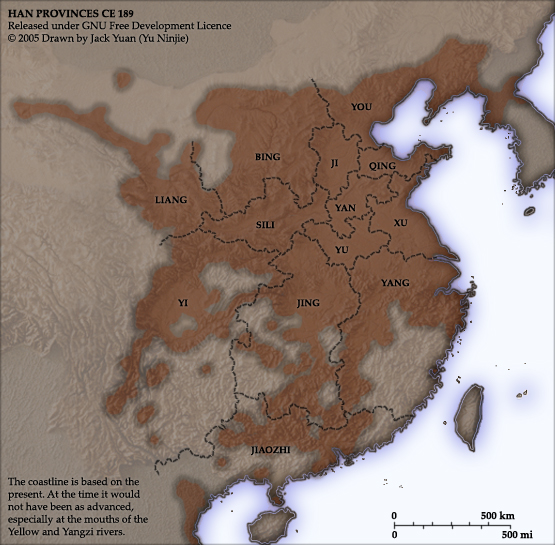
Chinese provinces in the late Eastern Han dynasty period, 189 CE

The Han dynasty received the submission of the Nanyue commanders in Jiaozhi and Jiuzhen, confirming them in their posts and ushering in the "First Era of Northern Domination" in Vietnamese history. These commanderies were headed by grand administrators (taishou) who were later overseen by the inspectors (刺史, cishi) of Jiaozhou or "Jiaozhi Province" (Giao Chỉ bộ), the first of whom was Shi Dai.

Under the Han, the political center of the former Nanyue lands was moved from Panyu (Guangzhou) south to Jiaozhi. The capital of Jiaozhi was first Mê Linh (Miling) (within modern Hanoi's Me Linh district) and then Luy Lâu, within Bac Ninh's Thuan Thanh district. According to the Book of Han’s "Treatise on Geography", Jiaozhi contained 10 counties: Leilou (羸𨻻), Anding (安定), Goulou (苟屚), Miling (麊泠), Quyang (曲昜), Beidai (北帶), Jixu (稽徐), Xiyu (西于), Longbian (龍編), and Zhugou (朱覯). Đào Duy Anh stated that Jiaozhi's territory contained all of Tonkin, excluding the regions upstream of the Black River and Ma River. Southwestern Guangxi was also part of Jiaozhi. The southwest area of present-day Ninh Bình was the border of Jiuzhen. Later, the Han dynasty created another commandery named Rinan (Nhật Nam) located south of Jiuzhen, stretching from the Ngang Pass to Quảng Nam Province.

One of the Grand Administrators of Jiaozhi was Su Ding. In AD 39, two sisters Trưng Trắc and Trưng Nhị who were daughters of the Lac lord of Mê Linh, led an uprising that quickly spread to an area stretching approximate modern-day Vietnam (Jiaozhi, Jiuzhen, Hepu and Rinan), forcing Su Ding and the Han army to flee. All of Lac lords submitted to Trưng Trắc and crowned her Queen. In AD 42 the Han empire struck back by sending an reconquest expedition led by Ma Yuan. Copper columns of Ma Yuan was supposedly erected by Ma Yuan after he had suppressed the uprising of the Trưng Sisters in AD 43. Ma Yuan followed his conquest with a brutal course of assimilation, destroying the natives' bronze drums in order to build the column, on which the inscription "If this bronze column collapses, Jiaozhi will be destroyed" was carved, at the edge of the Chinese empire. Following the defeat of Trưng sisters, thousands of Chinese immigrants (mostly soldiers) arrived and settled in Jiaozhi, adopted surname Ma, and married with local Lac Viet girls, began the developing of Han-Viet ruling class while local Lac ruling-class families who had submitted to Ma Yuan were used as local functionaries in Han administration and were natural participants in the intermarriage process. In 100, Cham people in Xianglin county (near modern-day Huế) revolted against the Han rule due to high taxes. The Cham plundered and burned down the Han centers. The Han respond by putting down the rebellion, executed their leaders and granting Xianglin a two-year tax respite. In 136 and 144, Cham people again launched another two rebellions which provoked mutinies in the Imperial army from Jiaozhi and Jiuzhen, then rebellion in Jiaozhi. The governor of Jiaozhi, according to Kiernan, "lured them to surrender" with "enticing words."

In 115, the Wuhu Li of Cangwu district revolted against the Han. In the following year, thousand of rebels from Yulin and Hepu besieged Cangwu. Empress Dowager Deng decided to avoid conflict and instead sent attendant censor Ren Chuo with a proclamation to grant them amnesty.

In 157, Lac leader Chu Đạt in Jiuzhen attacked and killed the Chinese magistrate, then marched north with an army of four to five thousand. The governor of Jiuzhen, Ni Shi, was killed. The Han general of Jiuzhen, Wei Lang, gathered an army and defeated Chu Đạt, beheading 2,000 rebels.

In 159 and 161, Indian merchants arrived Jiaozhi and paid tributes to the Han government.

In 166, a Roman trade mission arrived Jiaozhi, bringing tributes to the Han, which "were likely bought from local markets" of Rinan and Jiaozhi.

In 178, Wuhu people under Liang Long sparked a revolt against the Han in Hepu and Jiaozhi. Liang Long spread his revolt to all northern Vietnam, Guangxi and central Vietnam as well, attracting all non-Chinese ethnic groups in Jiaozhi to join. In 181, the Han empire sent general Chu Chuan to deal with the revolt. In June 181 Liang Long was captured and beheaded, and his rebellion was suppressed.

In 192, Cham people in Xianglin county led by Khu Liên successful revolted against the Han dynasty. Khu Liên found the independent kingdom of Lâm Ấp.

Jiaozhi emerged as the economic center of gravity on the southern coast of the Han empire. In 2 AD, the region reported four times as many households as Nanhai (modern Guangdong), while its population density is estimated to be 9.6 times larger than that of Guangdong. Jiaozhi was a key supplier of rice and produced prized handicrafts and natural resources. The region's location was highly favorable to trade. Well connected to central China via the Ling Canal, it formed the nearest connection between the Han court and the Maritime Silk Road.

By the end of the second century AD, Buddhism (brought from India via sea by Indian Buddhists centuries earlier) had become the most common religion of Jiaozhi.

=== Three Kingdoms ===
During the Three Kingdoms period, Jiaozhi's commanders pledged loyalty to Wu from the year 220. It was administered from Longbian (Long Biên) by Shi Xie on behalf of the Wu. This family controlled several surrounding commanderies, but upon the headman's death Guangzhou was formed as a separate province from northeastern Jiaozhou and Shi Xie's son attempted to usurp his father's appointed replacement. In retaliation, Sun Quan executed the son and most of his brothers, demoting the remainder of the family to common status. A local rebellion shifted control of the province to Wei and then Jin from 266–271 but Wu briefly regained control before its complete conquest in 280.

=== Six Dynasties, Sui, and Tang ===
Under the Six Dynasties, Jiaozhi generally adhered to the southern dynasties based in Jiankang (modern Nanjing). Upon the Sui conquest of Chen, it formed part of the Sui and Tang Empires until it was replaced in 679 by the new administration of Annam, the Annan Protectorate.

=== Ming dynasty ===
During the Fourth Chinese domination of Vietnam, the Ming dynasty revived the historical name Jiaozhi and created the Jiaozhi Province in northern Vietnam. After repelling the Ming forces, Lê Lợi dismissed all former administrative structure and divided the nation into 5 dao. Thus, Giao Chỉ and Giao Châu have never been names of official administrative units ever since.

== Sino-Roman contact ==
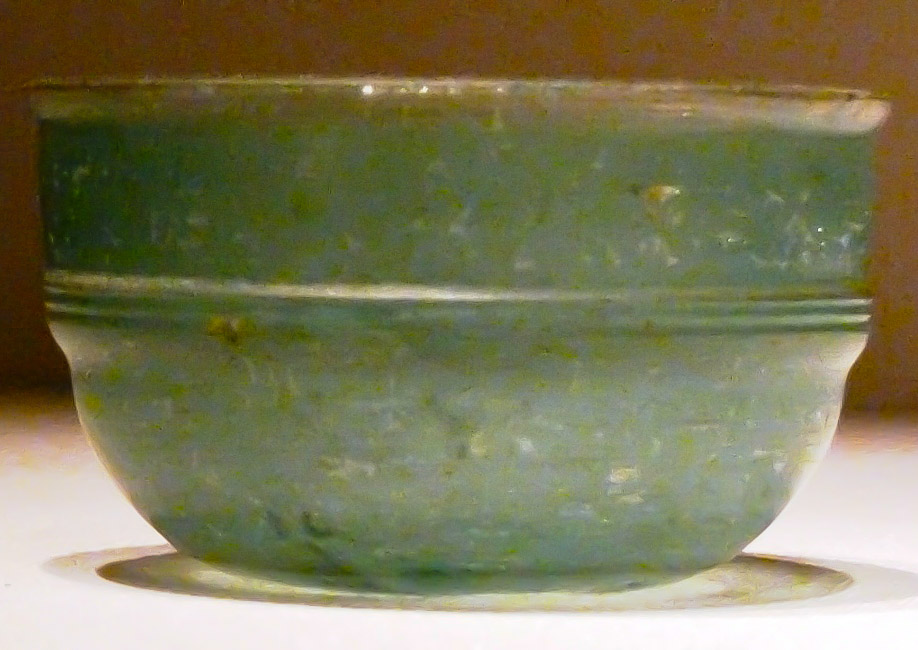
Green Roman glass cup unearthed from an Eastern Han dynasty (25–220 AD) tomb, Guangxi, China

In 166 CE An-tun (Marcus Aurelius Antoninus) of the state of Ta Ch'in sent missionaries from beyond Rinan to offer presents of ivory, rhinoceros horn, and tortoise to the Han court. Hou Han Shu records:

In the ninth Yanxi year [AD 166], during the reign of Emperor Huan, the king of Da Qin [the Roman Empire], Andun (Marcus Aurelius Antoninus, r. 161–180), sent envoys from beyond the frontiers through Rinan... During the reign of Emperor He [AD 89–105], they sent several envoys carrying tribute and offerings. Later, the Western Regions rebelled, and these relations were interrupted. Then, during the second and the fourth Yanxi years in the reign of Emperor Huan [AD 159 and 161], and frequently since, [these] foreigners have arrived [by sea] at the frontiers of Rinan [Commandery in modern central Vietnam] to present offerings.

The Book of Liang states:

The merchants of this country [the Roman Empire] frequently visit Funan [in the Mekong delta], Rinan (Annam) and Jiaozhi [in the Red River Delta near modern Hanoi]; but few of the inhabitants of these southern frontier states have come to Da Qin. During the 5th year of the Huangwu period of the reign of Sun Quan [AD 226] a merchant of Da Qin, whose name was Qin Lun came to Jiaozhi [Tonkin]; the prefect [taishou] of Jiaozhi, Wu Miao, sent him to Sun Quan [the Wu emperor], who asked him for a report on his native country and its people."

The capital of Jiaozhi was proposed by Ferdinand von Richthofen in 1877 to have been the port known to the geographer Ptolemy and the Romans as Kattigara, situated near modern Hanoi. Richthofen's view was widely accepted until archaeology at Óc Eo in the Mekong Delta suggested that site may have been its location. Kattigara seems to have been the main port of call for ships traveling to China from the West in the first few centuries AD, before being replaced by Guangdong.

In terms of archaeological finds, a Republican-era Roman glassware has been found at a Western Han tomb in Guangzhou along the South China Sea, dated to the early 1st century BC. In addition, from a site near the Red River in the northern Vietnamese province of Lao Cai (borders with Yunnan), a glass bowl dated from late first century BC to early first century AD was recovered along with 40 ancient artifacts including seven Heger type I drums. At Óc Eo, then part of the Kingdom of Funan near Jiaozhi, Roman golden medallions made during the reign of Antoninus Pius and his successor Marcus Aurelius have been found. This may have been the port city of Kattigara described by Ptolemy, laying beyond the Golden Chersonese (i.e. Malay Peninsula).

== See also ==
- Kang Senghui, a Buddhist monk of Sogdian origin who lived in Jiaozhi during the 3rd century
- Tonkin, an exonym for northern Vietnam, approximately identical to the Jiaozhi region
- Cochinchina, an exonym for (southern) Vietnam, yet cognate with the term Jiaozhi

== Sources ==
=== Articles ===
- Borell, Brigitte (2012). "The Han period glass dish from Lao Cai, Northern Vietnam". Journal of Indo-Pacific Archaeology. 32.
- Chamberlain, James R. (2016). "Kra-Dai and the Proto-History of South China and Vietnam". Journal of the Siam Society. 104.
- Churchman, Michael (2010). "Before Chinese and Vietnamese in the Red River Plain: The Han–Tang Period" (PDF). Chinese Southern Diaspora Studies. 4. Archived from the original (PDF) on 9 March 2021.
- Ferlus, Michel (2009). "Formation of Ethnonyms in Southeast Asia". 42nd International Conference on Sino-Tibetan Languages and Linguistics. 31: 1–6 – via HAL.
- Masanari, Nishimura (2005). "Settlement patterns on the Red River plain from the late prehistoric period to the 10th century AD". Bulletin of the Indo-Pacific Prehistory Association. 25: 99–107. doi:10.7152/bippa.v25i0.11920 (inactive 12 July 2025).
- Noriko, Nishino (2017). "An Introduction to Dr. Nishimura Masanari's Research on the Lung Khe Citadel". Asian Review of World Histories. 5 (2): 11–27. doi:10.1163/22879811-12340003 – via Brill.
- Pain, Frédéric (2008). "An Introduction to Thai Ethnonymy: Examples from Shan and Northern Thai". Journal of the American Oriental Society. 128 (4): 641–662. JSTOR 25608449.
- Taylor, K. (2017). "What Lies Behind the Earliest Story of Buddhism in Ancient Vietnam?". The Journal of Asian Studies. 77 (1): 107–122. doi:10.1017/S0021911817000985 – via Cambridge University Press.

=== Books ===
- An, Jiayao (2002), "When Glass Was Treasured in China", in Juliano, Annette L.; Lerner, Judith A. (eds.), Silk Road Studies VII: Nomads, Traders, and Holy Men Along China's Silk Road, Brepols Publishers, pp. 79–94, ISBN 2503521789
- Chamberlain, James R. (2000). "The origin of the Sek: implications for Tai and Vietnamese history" (PDF). In Burusphat, Somsonge (ed.). Proceedings of the International Conference on Tai Studies, July 29–31, 1998. Bangkok, Thailand: Institute of Language and Culture for Rural Development, Mahidol University. ISBN 974-85916-9-7.
- Churchman, Catherine (2016). The People Between the Rivers: The Rise and Fall of a Bronze Drum Culture, 200–750 CE. Rowman & Littlefield Publishers. ISBN 978-1-442-25861-7.
- Churchman, Michael (2011), ""The People in Between": The Li and the Lao from the Han to the Sui", in Li, Tana; Anderson, James A. (eds.), The Tongking Gulf Through History, Pennsylvania: University of Pennsylvania Press, pp. 67–86, ISBN 978-0-812-20502-2
- Li, Tana (2011). "Jiaozhi (Giao Chỉ) in the Han period Tongking Gulf". In Cooke, Nola; Li, Tana; Anderson, James A. (eds.). The Tongking Gulf Through History. University of Pennsylvania Press. pp. 39–53. ISBN 9780812205022.
- Fan, Chengda (2011). Hargett, James M. (ed.). Treatises of the Supervisor and Guardian of the Cinnamon Sea: The Natural World and Material Culture of Twelfth-Century China. University of Washington Press. ISBN 978-0-29599-079-8.
- Hill, John E. (2009). Through the Jade Gate to Rome: A Study of the Silk Routes during the Later Han Dynasty, 1st to 2nd Centuries CE. Charleston, South Carolina: BookSurge. ISBN 978-1-4392-2134-1.
- Kiernan, Ben (2019). Việt Nam: a history from earliest time to the present. Oxford University Press.
- Loewe, Michael (1986), "The conduct of government and the issues at stake (A.D. 57-167)", in Twitchett, Denis C.; Fairbank, John King (eds.), The Cambridge History of China: Volume 1, The Ch'in and Han Empires, 221 BC–AD 220, Cambridge: Cambridge University Press, pp. 291–316
- Osborne, Milton (2006). The Mekong: Turbulent Past, Uncertain Future. Crows Nest: Allen & Unwin. ISBN 1-74114-893-6.
- Pulleyblank, E.G. (1983). "The Chinese and their neighbors in prehistoric and early historic times". In Keightly, David N. (ed.). The Origins of Chinese Civilization. Berkeley: University of California Press.
- Reid, Anthony (1993), Southeast Asia in the Age of Commerce, vol. 2: Expansion and Crisis, New Haven: Yale University Press
- Richthofen, Ferdinand von (1944), "China", in Hennig, Richard (ed.), Terrae incognitae : eine Zusammenstellung und kritische Bewertung der wichtigsten vorcolumbischen Entdeckungsreisen an Hand der daruber vorliegenden Originalberichte, Band I, Altertum bis Ptolemäus, Leiden: Brill, pp. 387, 410–411
- Schafer, Edward Hetzel (1967), The Vermilion Bird: T'ang Images of the South, Los Angeles: University of California Press
- Schliesinger, Joachim (2018a). Origin of the Tai People 5 – Cradle of the Tai People and the Ethnic Setup Today Volume 5 of Origin of the Tai People. Booksmango. ISBN 978-1641531825.
- Schliesinger, Joachim (2018b). Origin of the Tai People 6 – Northern Tai-Speaking People of the Red River Delta and Their Habitat Today Volume 6 of Origin of the Tai People. Booksmango. ISBN 978-1641531832.
- Taylor, Keith Weller (1983). The Birth of the Vietnam. University of California Press. ISBN 978-0-520-07417-0.
- Xiong, Victor Cunrui (2009), "Jiaozhi", Historical Dictionary of Medieval China, Lanham: Scarecrow Press, p. 251, ISBN 978-0-8108-6053-7
- Yu, Ying-shih (1986), "Han foreign relations", in Twitchett, Denis C.; Fairbank, John King (eds.), The Cambridge History of China: Volume 1, The Ch'in and Han Empires, 221 BC–AD 220, Cambridge: Cambridge University Press, pp. 377–463
- Yule, Henry (1995). A glossary of colloquial Anglo-Indian words and phrases: Hobson-Jobson. Routledge. ISBN 978-0-7007-0321-0.
- Young, Gary K. (2001). Rome's Eastern Trade: International Commerce and Imperial Policy, 31 BC – AD 305. London & New York: Routledge. ISBN 0-415-24219-3.
- Zürcher, Erik (2002): "Tidings from the South, Chinese Court Buddhism and Overseas Relations in the Fifth Century AD." Erik Zürcher in: A Life Journey to the East. Sinological Studies in Memory of Giuliano Bertuccioli (1923–2001). Edited by Antonio Forte and Federico Masini. Italian School of East Asian Studies. Kyoto. Essays: Volume 2, pp. 21–43.
