= Ma Yuan (Han dynasty) =

Chinese military general and politician of the Eastern Han dynasty (14 BC – 49 AD)

- 馬援
- Born: 14 BC; Xingping, Shaanxi
- Died: 49 AD (aged 62)
- Other names: Wenyuan (文淵); Marquis Zhongcheng (忠成侯)
- Children: Ma Liao; Ma Fang; Ma Guang; Ma Keqing; Ma Jiang; Empress Ma; three other daughters
- Relatives: Ma Kuang (brother); Ma Yu (brother); Ma Yuan (brother); Lady Ma (sister); Ma Zhong (father)
- Military career
- Allegiance: Han dynasty
- Conflicts: Trung sisters' rebellion

Ma Yuan (Chinese: 馬援; 14 BC – 49 AD), courtesy name Wenyuan, also known by his official title Fubo Jiangjun (伏波将军; "General who Calms the Waves"), was a Chinese military general and politician of the Eastern Han dynasty. He played a prominent role in defeating the Trung sisters' rebellion.

His military and political achievements included helping Emperor Guangwu unite the empire and putting down rebellions of the Trung Sisters (in Jiaozhi, modern Vietnam) and the Wulin tribes (in modern eastern Guizhou and northwestern Hunan). He fell ill during an expedition to modern Hunan in 49 AD, and died soon afterwards. Prior to that, Ma Yuan contributed to Emperor Guangwu's defeat of the warlord Wei Xiao (隗囂), who controlled the modern eastern Gansu region.

== Life and career ==
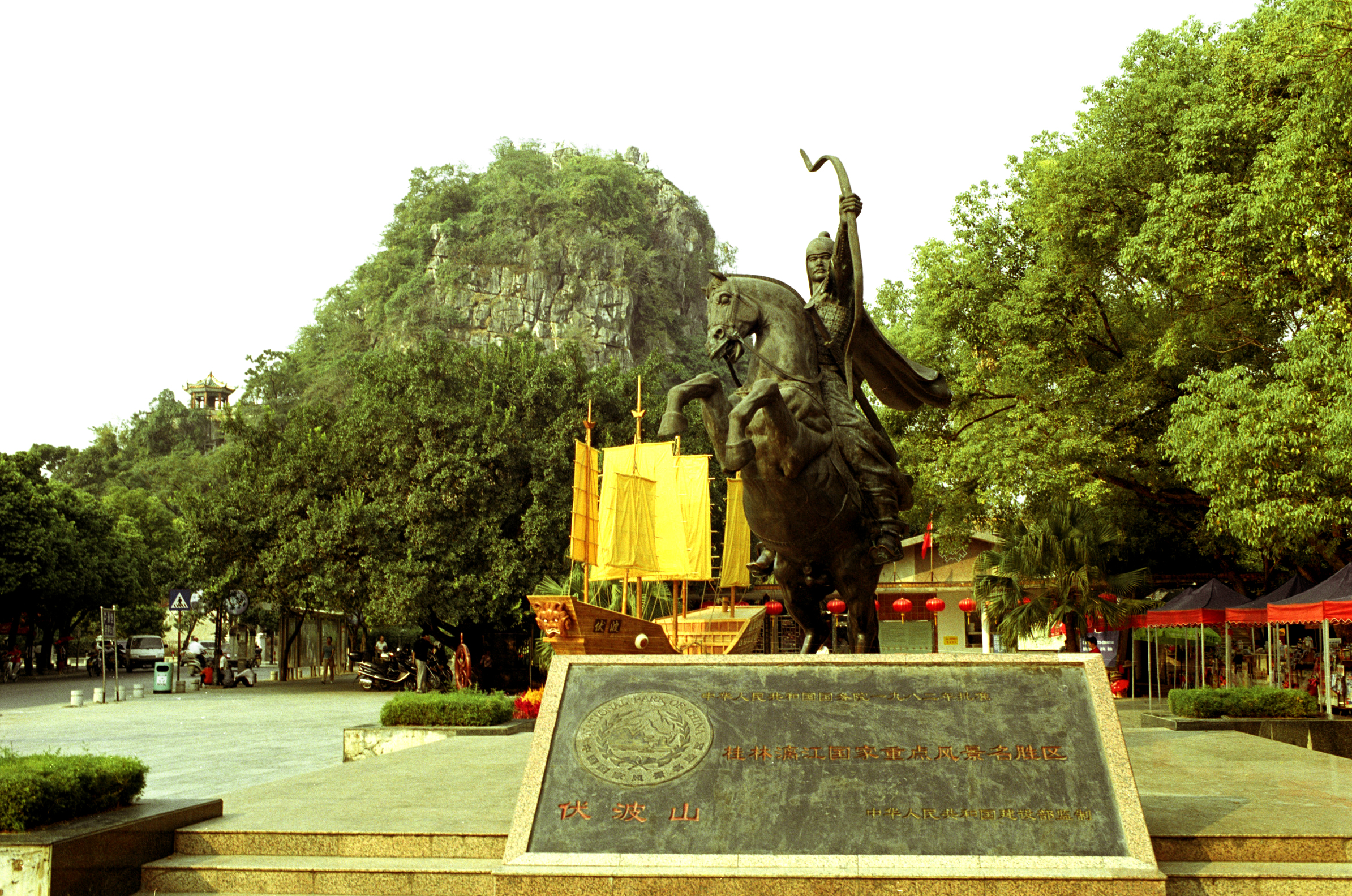
Statue of Ma Yuan on Mount Fubo, Guilin

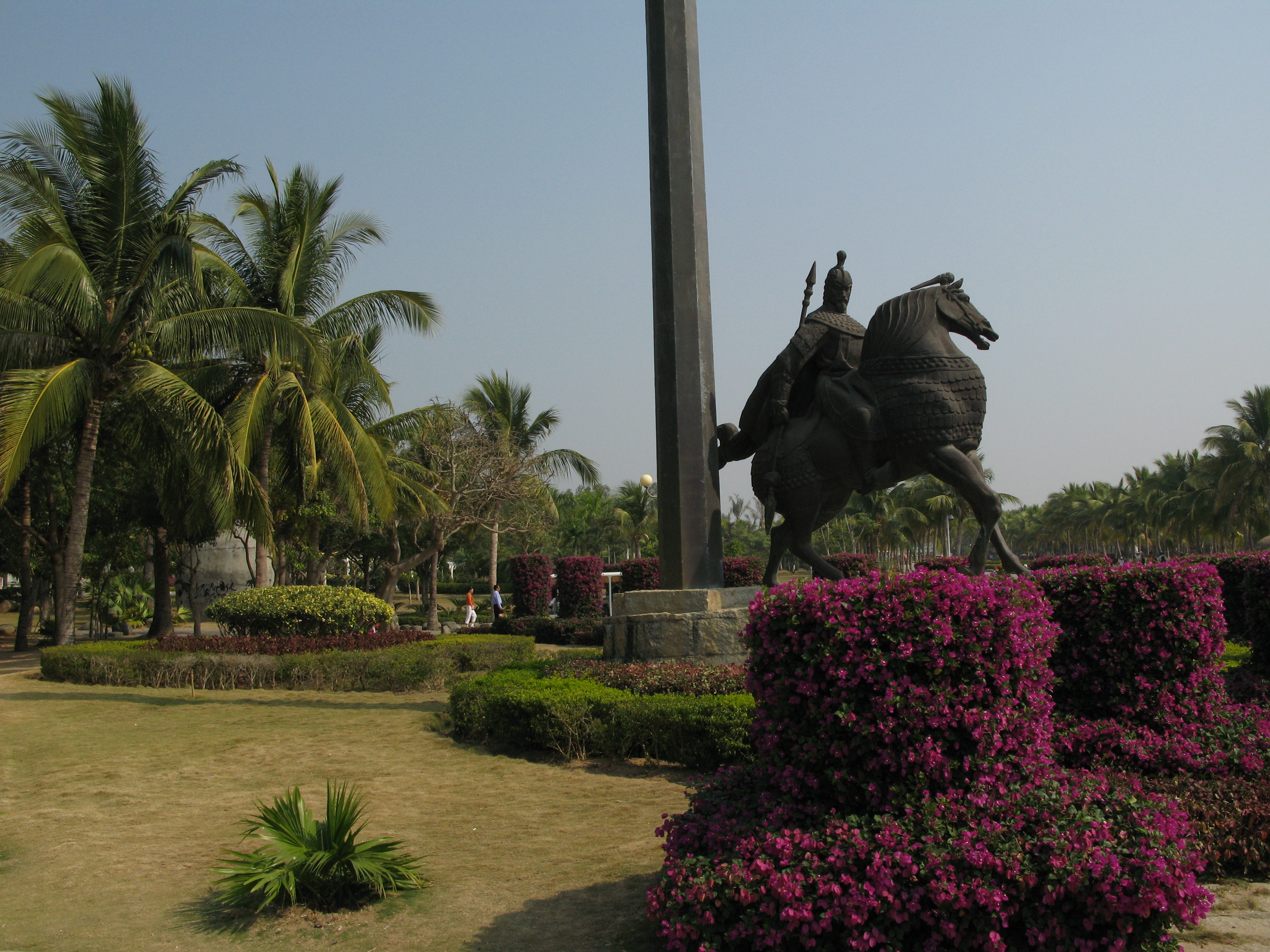
Ma Yuan's statue in Hainan

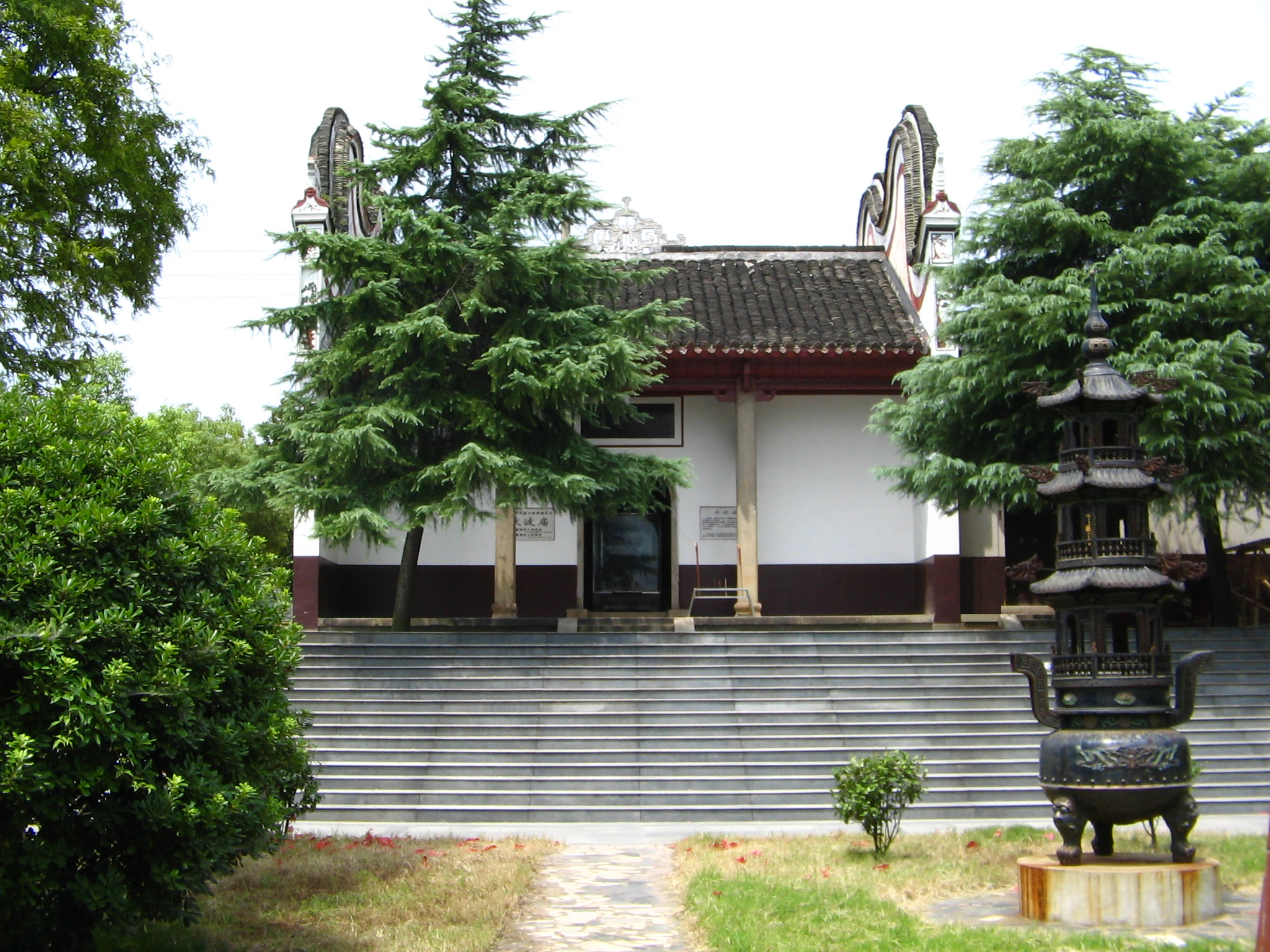
Fubo Temple in Zhuzhou County, Hunan

=== Early life ===
Ma Yuan was a native of what is now Xingping, Shaanxi province, descended from Zhao Mu, a son of the Warring States period general Zhao She from the State of Zhao, because Zhao She was made as the administrator of a district called Mafu (馬服; in present-day north of Handan city in Hebei province) by King Huiwen, Zhao Mu' descendants adopted "Ma" (馬) as their surname.

Ma Yuan's great-grandfather Ma Tong's older brother Ma Heluo attempted to assassinate emperor Wu of Han, but was stopped by Jin Midi. Ma Heluo and Ma Tong were both executed for this matter. Ma Yuan's daughter empress Mingde hated the rebellious behavior of her ancestor and changed Ma Tong and Ma Heluo's surname to Mang (莽).

=== Qiang campaign ===
He also subjugated the Qiang. In 34 A.D., the Xianlian Qiang and a number of other tribes, raided Chinese positions in Jincheng and Longxi commanderies and were defeated by Han armies. A few months later, Lai Xi was killed on campaign against Gongsun Shu, but his assistant, Ma Yuan, Grand Administrator of Lonxi commandery, continued operations against the Qiang. In 35, the Xianlian tribe were again defeated, first at Lintao in Longxi and then along the Xining river in Jincheng commandery. In the two separate campaigns, Ma Yuan captured more than ten thousand head of horses, cattle and sheep, together with considerable stores of grain. He was wounded in the leg during one of the final engagements, and he did not completely destroy the enemy, but he did drive them away from the valley lands of Jincheng, and he was rewarded with Imperial commendation and several thousand of the animals he had captured.

Though members of the Qiang had escaped across the borders, Ma Yuan's victories in 35 had broken the power of the Xianlian tribe and had made possible a restoration of Chinese positions on the old frontiers.

=== Trung sisters' rebellion ===
Ma was placed in command of the campaign to suppress the Trung sisters' rebellion. He was given the title Fubo Jiangjun (伏波將軍; General who Calms the Waves). Ma Yuan and his staff began mobilizing a Han army in southern China. It comprised about 10,000 troops. From Guangdong, Ma Yuan dispatched a fleet of supply ships along the coast. He led the Han army through difficult terrain towards the Red River Delta, where they arrived in early 43 AD. The rebellion was brought under control by April or May.

=== Death ===
In 49 while on expedition against the Wulin tribes (in modern eastern Guizhou and northwestern Hunan), Ma died from a plague which also killed a large number of his soldiers.

After his death, Ma's deputy Geng Shu (耿舒), who had disagreed with Ma's strategy, and Emperor Guangwu's son-in-law Liang Song (梁松), who had prior grudges against Ma, falsely accused Ma of many crimes. Two specific accusations that are known are that Ma, by the route he took against the Wulin tribes, was responsible for the plague, and that he had, while on campaigns, embezzled pearls and rhinoceros horns. The latter accusation was a misunderstanding in that one of Ma's favorite foods (which he considered capable of warding off plague) was Chinese pearl barley, produced in southern China and northern Vietnam, which Ma had transported in large quantities back to the capital Luoyang. Emperor Guangwu believed these false accusations and posthumously stripped Ma of his fief and title of marquess.

Ma's daughter became Empress Ma of the Han dynasty in 57, after which his reputation was restored.

Eastern Han dynasty general Ma Teng was a descendant of Ma Yuan.

== Legacy ==
=== Memorials ===
Ma Yuan is worshipped as a deity in numerous temples in China and Vietnam. The Fubo Temples of Zhuzhou County, Hunan and Heng County, Guangxi are among the best known. Mount Fubo and Fubo Park in Guilin, Guangxi are also named after him.

Vietnamese temples to the Han dynasty general also existed in Cổ Loa, Thanh Hóa Province, Phú Yên Province, and Bắc Ninh Province during the 19th and 20th centuries. A 1938 report from a village in Bắc Ninh described worship of Ma Yuan in addition to their worship of the Trưng sisters as their main guardian. In southern Vietnam, temples dedicated to Ma Yuan were largely located in Chinese temples or areas associated with Vietnamese communities of Chinese descent. The practice of worshipping Ma Yuan was believed to have been brought by Chinese immigrants, but historian Li Tana expressed the "strong possibility that the story was the other way around - that the Chinese adopted the Ma Yuan cult from the Vietnamese" because the worship of Ma Yuan as a local deity was already widespread in Vietnam and because Ma Yuan was called a bản thổ công ("local spirit").

==== Hanoi Bạch Mã temple controversy ====
Some authors suggest that Ma Yuan was worshipped at the Bạch Mã temple in Hanoi in some capacity before the worship of Ma Yuan in Vietnam was largely eliminated after the 1979 Sino-Vietnamese War. A 1956 École française d'Extrême-Orient book by Vũ Đăng Minh and Nguyễn Phú Hợi described the existence of a statue to Ma Yuan in the temple, and the Office of Cultural Affairs of the Administration of Hanoi documented the existence of a statue to Ma Yuan in the temple as recently as 1984. By the early 21st century, Vietnamese people of Chinese origin living near the temple said that they had never heard of Ma Yuan being worshipped in the temple before.

The original deity of the temple may have been Long Đỗ (a god associated with river and dragon) or Bạch Mã before later Chinese immigrants and travelers confused the name for Ma Yuan, or deliberately used forgery to create the appearance that Ma Yuan was the deity at the temple. None of the Vietnamese imperial edicts bestowed on the temple mentioned Ma Yuan. When Chinese traveler Zheng Junan visited Tonkin in 1714, he investigated the temple and the legend of Bạch Mã through old Vietnamese records and interviews of elderly people, and found no connection to Ma Yuan. Zheng concluded in his work Bạch Mã thần từ khảo chính that the association of the temple with Ma Yuan was a recent one created by Chinese immigrants. Historian Olga Dror suggests two alternative possibilities: that Bạch Mã was originally worshipped by older Chinese and Kinh communities at the temple before newer waves of Chinese settlers from the 17th century onwards merged the two; or that Ma Yuan was originally worshipped at the temple before it fell into obscurity after the Third Era of Northern Domination to be replaced by the cult of Bạch Mã.

=== Legends ===
In the Romance of the Three Kingdoms, Zhuge Liang was inspired by a temple of Ma Yuan en route to overcoming the rebellion of Meng Huo and the Nanman.

Ma Yuan was the source of two Chinese chengyu idioms. One, "wrapping one's body with horse leather" (馬革裹屍), refers to being dedicated to one's responsibilities that one is willing to die on the battlefield and have his body be wrapped in horse leather; Ma had given this phrase while talking to a friend as to why he wished to continue in military service. The other, "drawing a tiger improperly results in a dog" (畫虎不成反類犬), refers to his admonition to his nephews to be careful in their conduct and not to try to imitate a famed heroic figure of the time, Du Bao (杜保) -- in that if one tried to imitate Du but was not as heroic as he was, one would end up becoming a frivolous hoodlum.
