= Louchuan =

Type of Chinese naval vessel

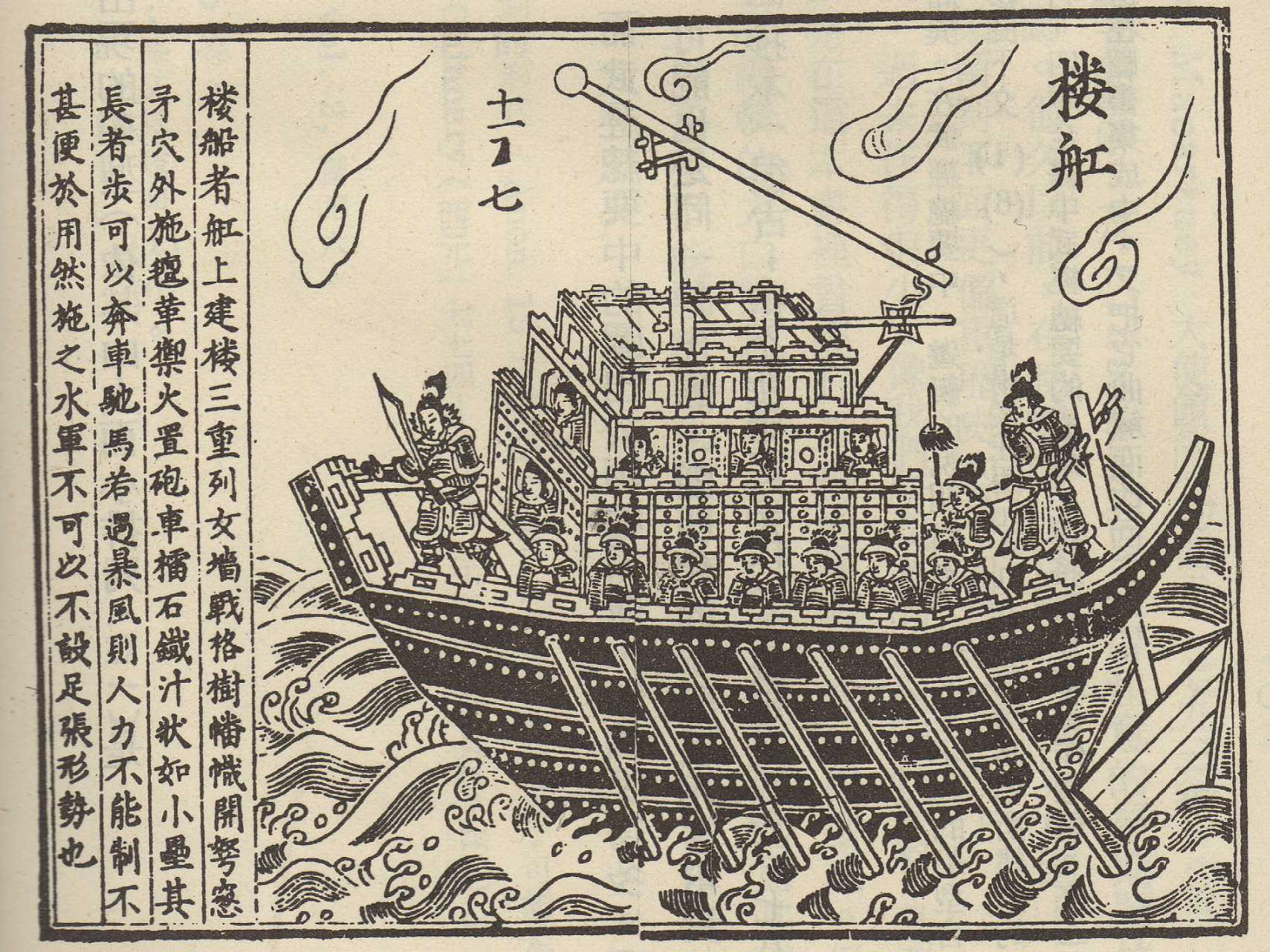
A Song dynasty louchuan with a trebuchet, depicted in the Wujing Zongyao

Louchuan (traditional Chinese: 樓船; simplified Chinese: 楼船; pinyin: lóuchuán; lit. 'tower ships') were a type of Chinese naval vessels, primarily a floating fortress, which have seen use since the Han dynasty. Meant to be a central vessel in the fleet, the louchuan was equipped for boarding and attacking enemy vessels, as well as with siege weapons including traction trebuchets for ranged combat.

== Description ==
Historical records relating to the louchuan are found in sources such as the military treatise Wujing Zongyao, written during the Song dynasty, and the Taibai Yinjing from the Tang dynasty. From the latter (as translated by British biochemist, sinologist, and historian Joseph Needham), the tower ships were described as:

Tower ships (lou chuan); these ships have three decks equipped with bulwarks for the fighting lines, and flags and pennants flying from the masts. There are ports and openings for crossbows and lances [and at the sides there is provided felt leather to protect against fire], while (on the topmost deck) there are trebuchets for hurling stones, set up (in appropriate places). And there are also (arrangements for making) molten iron (for throwing in containers from these catapults). (The whole broadside) gives the appearance of a city wall. In the Jin period the Prancing-Dragon Admiral, Wang Jun, invading Wu, built a great ship 200 paces (1000 ft.) in length, and on it set flying rafters and hanging galleries on which chariots and horses could go. But if [all of a sudden] a violent wind is encountered, (such ships are likely to) get out of human control, so they were judged inconvenient in practice [for warlike action]. But the fleet cannot fail to be furnished with such ships, in order that its overawing might may be perfected.

The use of such ships in riverine warfare, especially along the Yangtze River, stretches back to the late Han dynasty, and perhaps even earlier.

== See also ==
- Naval history of China
- Battle of Lake Poyang
