= Trưng sisters =

1st-century AD Vietnamese queens and military leaders

Trưng Nữ Vương 徵女王
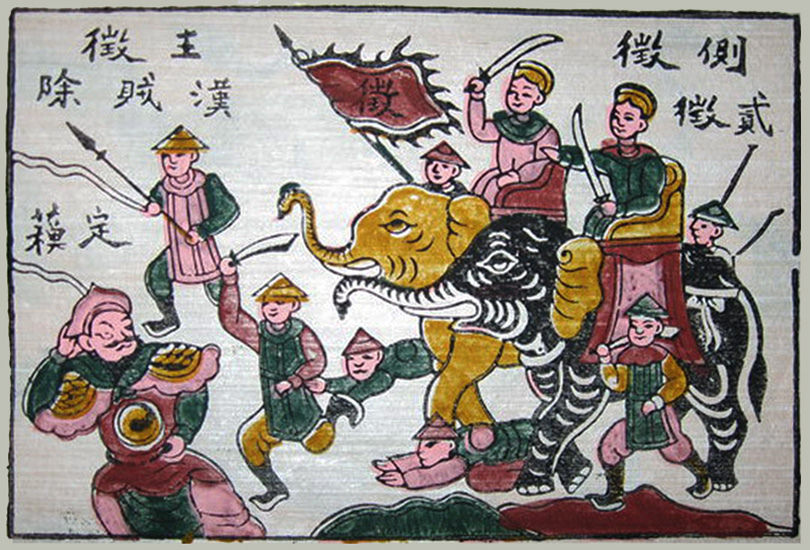
- The Trung sisters chase away the enemy (Dong Ho folk painting)

Queen of Lingnam
- Reign: 40–43
- Predecessor: Established; First Era of Northern Domination
- Successor: Disestablished; Second Era of Northern Domination
- Born: c. 14 CE
- Died: c. 43 CE (aged 29–30); Lingnan
- Spouse: Thi Sách
Names
- Trưng Trắc (徵側)
Posthumous name
- Trưng Thánh vương (徵聖王); Linh Trinh Nhị phu nhân (靈貞二夫人); Kính Thắng phu nhân (敬勝夫人); Kính Thắng Bảo Thuận phu nhân (敬勝保順夫人)

Trưng Nữ Vương

Chinese name
- Chinese: 徵女王
- Literal meaning: Trưng Queen
Transcriptions
Standard Mandarin
- Hanyu Pinyin: Zhēng Nǚwáng
Yue: Cantonese
- Yale Romanization: Jīng Néuih Wòhng
- Jyutping: Zing^{1} neoi^{5} wong^{4}

Vietnamese name
- Vietnamese alphabet: Trưng Nữ Vương
- Chữ Hán: 徵女王

- Trưng sisters
- Vietnamese: Hai Bà Trưng
- Hán-Nôm: 𠄩婆徵
- Literal meaning: Two ladies Trưng

The Trưng sisters, Trưng Trắc (Note: Vietnamese pronunciation: [ʈ͡ʂɯŋ ʈ͡ʂɐ̌k]; chữ Hán: 徵側; Chinese pinyin: Zhēng Cè; Wade–Giles: Cheng^{1} Ts'e^{4}; Old Chinese: *trəŋ-[ts]rək) and Trưng Nhị, (Note: Vietnamese pronunciation: [ʈ͡ʂɯŋ ɲîˀ]; chữ Hán: 徵貳; Chinese pinyin: Zhēng Èr ; Wade–Giles: Cheng^{1} Erh^{4}; Old Chinese: *trəŋni[j]-s), known in Vietnamese as Hai Bà Trưng (Vietnamese pronunciation: [haj ɓà ʈ͡ʂɯŋ], 𠄩婆徵, "Two Ladies [named] Trưng") or simply Hai Bà ("The Two Ladies"), c. 14 – c. 43), were Lạc Việt military leaders who ruled for three years after commanding a rebellion in AD 40 against the first Chinese domination of Vietnam. Trưng Trắc was the first female monarch in Vietnam, and she was posthumously recognized Queen Trưng (Note: chữ Quốc ngữ: Trưng Nữ vương, chữ Hán: 徵女王) in the Đại Việt sử ký toàn thư.

The Trưng sisters were born to an aristocratic family in Jiaozhi (Giao Chỉ), a commandery of the Chinese Han dynasty in what later is northern Vietnam. Following the death of Trưng Trắc's husband at the hands of the Chinese governor, the sisters rose up in rebellion, which spread from the Red River Delta to a broader area stretching from Hepu to Rinan. At the height of the uprising the sisters and their allies controlled some sixty-five towns and settlements, with Trưng Trắc being proclaimed queen regnant. In 42 AD, Emperor Guangwu of Han sent a punitive expedition force led by general Ma Yuan to crush the rebellion. The sisters were defeated a year later, after which they either were executed or committed suicide.

== Historical background ==
The former Qin commander Zhao Tuo (Trieu Da in Vietnamese) established the state of Nanyue in 204 BC and had conquered Âu Lạc in 180 BC, incorporating the Vietnamese realm into his own. In 112 BC, Emperor Wu of Han dispatched soldiers against Nanyue and the kingdom was annexed in 111 BC during the ensuing Han conquest of Nanyue. Nine commanderies were established to administer the region, three of which were located in what is now northern Vietnam. Revolts of local tribes against the Han began in 40 AD led by the Trưng sisters.

== Biography ==
The Trưng sisters were daughters of an aristocratic family of Lạc ethnicity. Their father had been a Lạc lord in Mê Linh district (modern-day Mê Linh District, Hanoi). Trưng Trắc's husband, Thi Sách (Shi Suo), was also the Lạc lord of Chu Diên (what later is Khoái Châu District, Hưng Yên Province). Su Ding, the Chinese governor of Jiaozhi province at the time, is remembered for his cruelty and tyranny. According to the Book of the Later Han, Thi Sách was "of a fierce temperament", and Su Ding attempted to restrain him with legal procedures, literally to behead him without trial. Trưng Trắc was stirred to action by her husband's killing and became the central figure in mobilizing the Lạc lords against the Chinese. In March of 40 AD, Trưng Trắc and her younger sister Trưng Nhị led the Lạc Việt to rise up in rebellion against the Han.

The Book of the Later Han recorded that Trưng Trắc launched the rebellion to avenge the killing of her husband. It began at the Red River Delta, and spread to other Lạc and non-Han peoples from an area stretching from Hepu Commandery to Rinan. Chinese settlements were overrun, and Su Ding fled. The uprising gained the support of about sixty-five towns and settlements. Trưng Trắc was proclaimed as queen regnant. The status of Trưng Nhị was not mentioned in Đại Việt sử ký toàn thư. According to Việt Nam sử lược, Trưng Nhị jointly reigned as co-king/queen but according to folk literature, Trưng Nhị became a vice-king/queen.

In 42 AD, the Emperor Guangwu of Han commissioned general Ma Yuan to suppress the rebellion with 20,000 troops. The rebellion of the two sisters was defeated in the next year as Ma Yuan captured and decapitated Trưng Trắc and Trưng Nhị, and then sent their heads to the Han court in Luoyang.

The Song dynasty poet and calligrapher Huang Tingjian (1045–1105) compared the Trưng sisters to Lü Jia, the prime minister of Nanyue who resisted Emperor Wu's army in 112 BCE:

Lü Jia refused treasonous bribe;
Trưng Trắc raised her shield to resist oppression

== Historiography ==
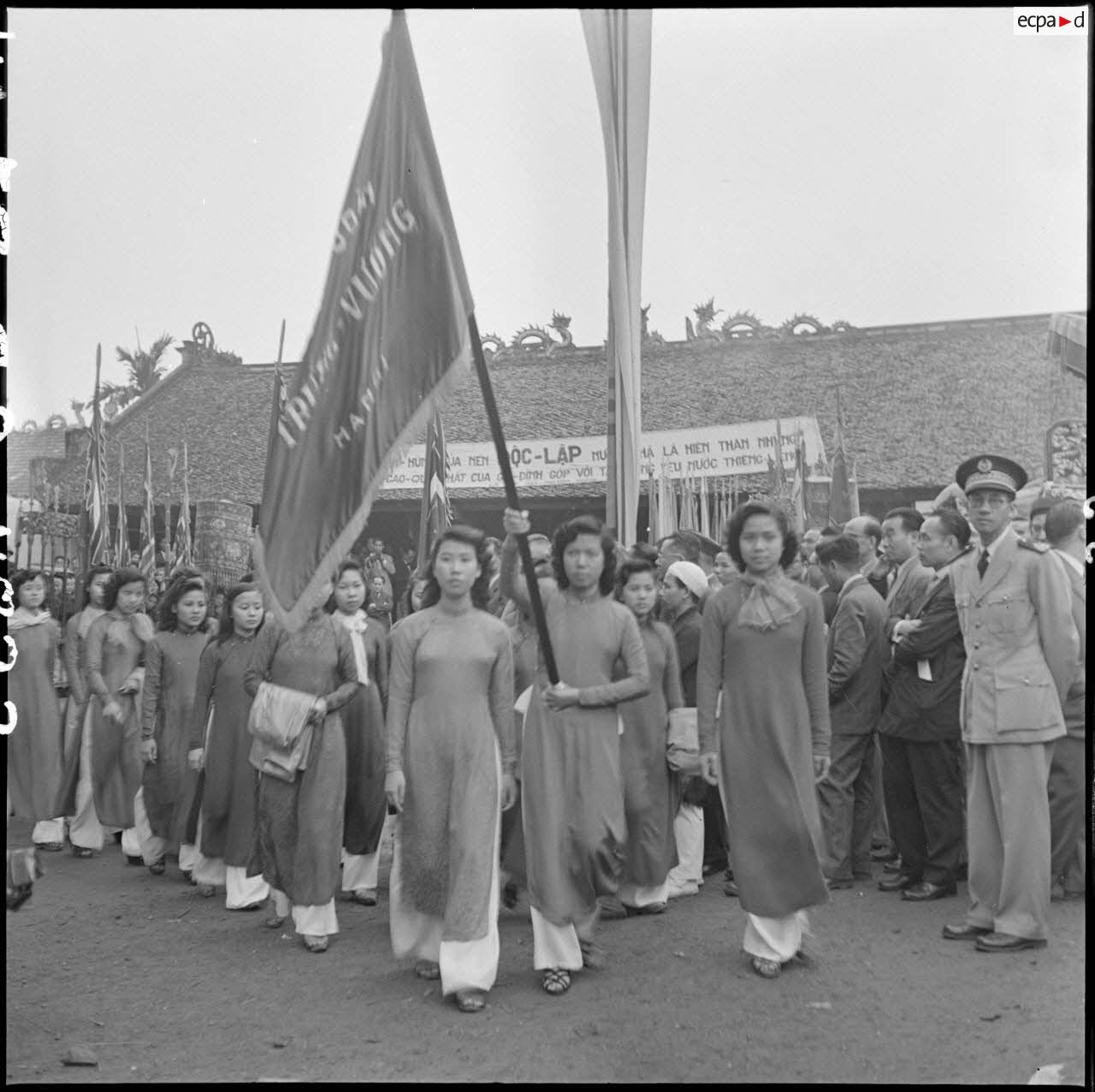
The Trưng Vương High School delegation was present to celebrate the anniversary of the Trưng Sisters' uprising at Đồng Nhân Temple in Hanoi 1953 during the State of Vietnam

=== Chinese sources ===
The Chinese traditional historical accounts on the Trưng sisters are found in several chapters of the Book of the Later Han, the history for the Eastern Han dynasty, against which the Trưng sisters had carried out their uprising.

==== Book of Later Han; 5th century AD ====
Chapter eighty-six of the Book of the Later Han, entitled Biographies of the Southern and the Southwestern Barbarians, (Note: The use of the word barbarians is historical, and is translated as used in the original Chinese texts.) has this passage:

In the 16th year of the Jianwu era (40 AD), Jiaozhi (交阯; WD: Chiao-chih) woman Zheng Ce (徵側; SV: Trưng Trắc) and her younger sister Zheng Er (徵貳; SV: Trưng Nhị) rebelled and attacked the commandery['s strongholds]. As for Zheng Ce, she was the daughter of the Luo general of Miling prefecture (麊泠; SV: Mê Linh). She was married as wife to Shi Suo (詩索; SV: Thi Sách), a man in Zhouyuan (朱鳶; SV: Chu Diên). She/he(?) was/They were(?) remarkably heroic and courageous. Su Ding (蘇定; WD: Su Ting), the administrator of Jiaozhi restrained her (them?) with law; Ce became infuriated, rebelled, and attacked. Thus, the barbarians in Jiuzhen (九眞; WD Chiu-chen), Rinan (日南; WD:Jih-nan), Hepu (合浦; WD: Hop'u) all supported her. All in all, she took sixty-five strongholds and established herself as queen. Jiaozhi's governor and administrators could but defend themselves. (Emperor) Guangwu thus decreed that Changsha (長沙; WD: Ch'ang-sha), Hepu, and Jiaozhi, all must furnish chariots and boats, repair roads and bridges, dredge obstructed waterways, and store foods and provisions. In the 18th year (42 CE), he dispatched Wave-Subduing General Ma Yuan (馬援; WD: Ma Yüan), Tower-ship General Duan Zhi (段志; WD: Tuan Chih) [and Household General Liu Long (劉隆; WD: Liu Long)], (Note: Liu Long was not mentioned here, yet Hou Hanshu's Account of Liu Long recorded that he also participated in this campaign against Trưng Trắc, and that he caught Trưng Nhị at the Forbidden Gorge (禁谿), beheaded over 1,000, and subdued over 20,000 rebels) who led over 10,000 troops from Ch'ang-sha, Guiyang (桂陽; SV: Quế Dương); Lingling (零陵; SV: Linh Lăng); Cangwu (蒼梧; SV: Thương Ngô) on a punitive expedition. Summer next year (43 CE), in the fourth month, Ma Yuan devastated Jiaozhi, beheaded Zheng Ce, Zheng Er, and others; the rest all surrendered or scattered. He advanced and attacked the Jiuzhen's rebel Du Yang (都陽; SV: Đô Dương) and others, routing and subduing them. He exiled over 300 rebel leaders to Lingling. Thus the regions beyond the Ridge were entirely pacified.

Chapter twenty-four, the biographies of Ma and some of his male descendants, had this parallel description:

Then Jiaozhi woman Zheng Ce and [her] younger sister Zheng Er rebelled; [they] attacked and the commandery was lost. The barbarians in Jiuzhen, Rinan, Hepu all supported [the Zheng sisters]. The rebels captured over sixty strongholds beyond the Ridge; Ce established herself as queen. Then a sealed decree honored Yuan as Wave-Subduing General, assigned Fule Marquis Liu Long as his assistant, dispatched Tower-ship general Duan Zhi, etc. southwards to attack Jiaozhi. When the army reached Hepu, Zhi fell ill and died; [the Emperor] decreed that Yuan command his [Zhi's] soldiers also. Then [Yuan's army] advanced along the coastline and the mountains, opening a path over thousands of li long. In the spring of the 18th [Jianwu] year (40 CE), [Yuan's] army reached up to Langbo (浪泊; SV: Lãng Bạc), fought with the rebels, routed them, decapitated thousands, [and] over tens of thousands surrendered. Yuan chased Zheng Ce to the Forbidden Gorge (禁谿; SV: Cấm Khê); defeated many times, the rebels then scattered and fled. The first month of next year (43 CE), Zheng Ce and Zheng Er were beheaded, their heads sent to Luoyang. Yuan was enfeoffed as Marquis of Xinsi, [his] fief [containing] three-thousand households. Yuan then slaughtered oxen, and distilled wines, and rewarded the soldiers [and] officers [for their] hard work...

Yuan commanded over 2,000 tower-ships big and small, over 20,000 soldiers, advanced and attacked the bandit Zheng Ce's remnants Du Yang (都羊, SV: Đô Dương) et al., from Wugong (無功; SV: Vô Công) to Jufeng (居風, SV: Cư Phong), beheading [or] capturing over 5,000; south of the mountains everywhere [was] pacified. Yuan reported that Xiyu prefecture (西於; SV: Tây Ư) had 32,000 households, its boundaries [were] over thousands of li from the court; he requested that [Xiyu prefecture] be divided into two prefectures: Fengxi (封溪, SV: Phong Khê) and Wanghai (望海; SV: Vọng Hải); [the request] was granted. Yuan immediately seized the momentum, established commanderies and prefectures, repaired the strongholds and ramparts, dredged the irrigation canals, and benefited the people. [Yuan] reported [to the Emperor] Yue law and Han law differed in more than ten rules; towards the Yue people, the old rules were clarified in order to restrain them. Henceforth, the Luoyue (駱越) obeyed General Ma's laws.

Autumn of the 20th year (44 CE), [Ma Yuan] brought the troops back to the capital; the troops had been suffering from miasma and epidemic, four to five died out of ten. Yuan was bestowed a military carriage; in court-meetings, [he] ranked among the Nine Ministers.

==== Records of Jiao Province's Outer Territories, 4th century AD ====
An older, yet less-known account, from the now-lost Records of Jiao Province's Outer Territories (交州外域記) was quoted in the 6th-century word Commentary on the Water Classic (水經注) by Northern Wei geographer Li Daoyuan:

Later, the son of Zhouyuan's Luo general, named Shi (詩; SV: Thi), asked (Note: The two characters "詩索", to be read as 'Shi/Thi asked', were instead misread as the name Shi Suo/Thi Sách; 索 "to ask" is the main verb of this sentence "後朱䳒雒將子名詩索𥹆泠雒將女名徵側爲妻") the daughter of Ming (Note: 𥹆 míng is possibly a clerical error for 麊 mí) ling's Luo general, named Zheng Ce (徵側; SV: Trưng Trắc), to be his wife. Ce, as a human being, possessed mettle and courage. Alongsides Shi, she uprose and rebelled, attacking and devastating Jiao Province, as well as reducing the Luo generals into subordination. Zheng Ce made [herself] queen. Starting from Miling prefecture, she occupied two divisions Jiaozhi and Jiuzhen, and for two years taxed the people. Later on, the Han (court) dispatched Wave-Subduing General to lead troops on a punitive expedition. Ce and Shi fled into the Golden Gorge (金溪 SV; Kim Khê). Ma Yuan hunted them down and captured them after three years. Now [from] Western Shu [there were] also troops dispatched on punitive expedition against Ce and Shi and others and all those commanderies and prefectures were pacified; then magistrates were instituted there.

In the 9th month of 19th year of the Jianwu era [43 CE], Ma Yuan reported to the Emperor that: 'I prudently added 12,000 crack-troops in Jiaozhi to the main army for a total of 20,000 men; as well as 2,000 vessels and vehicles, ever since entering Jiaozhi; now [our army] has become [even] stronger.' In the 10th month, Yuan [went] southwards and entered Jiuzhen; when he reached Vô Thiết prefecture (無切縣), the rebels' leader surrendered. He advanced and entered Dư Phát (餘發), rebels' leader Chu Bá (朱伯) abandoned the commandery and escaped into the deep jungles and great marshes where rhinoceroses and elephants gathered and goats and buffaloes numbered in the thousands; then, elephants were seen as in herds of several hundreds. Yuan again divided his troops, [and dispatched them] into Vô Biên prefecture (無編縣) – which was the Jiuzhending 九真亭 [prefecture] during Wang Mang['s era]. When [Ma Yuan] reached Cư Phong (風縣), the [rebels'] leader did not surrender; [Ma Yuan] then beheaded several tens to hundreds. Jiuzhen was then pacified.

=== Differences ===
The traditional Chinese accounts differed from Vietnamese traditional accounts in places: Chinese accounts do not indicate oppression of the Vietnamese population by the Chinese officials and Su Ding's killing of Trưng Trắc's husband; though Ma Yuan himself confirmed that Su Ding was greedy and cowardly. In the Chinese account, the Trưng sisters did not commit suicide. Chinese sources also contradicted accounts in Vietnamese folk history that the Trưng sisters' retainers followed their examples and also committed suicide.

=== Vietnamese chronicles ===
==== Excerpts from Complete Annals of Đại Việt, 1479 ====
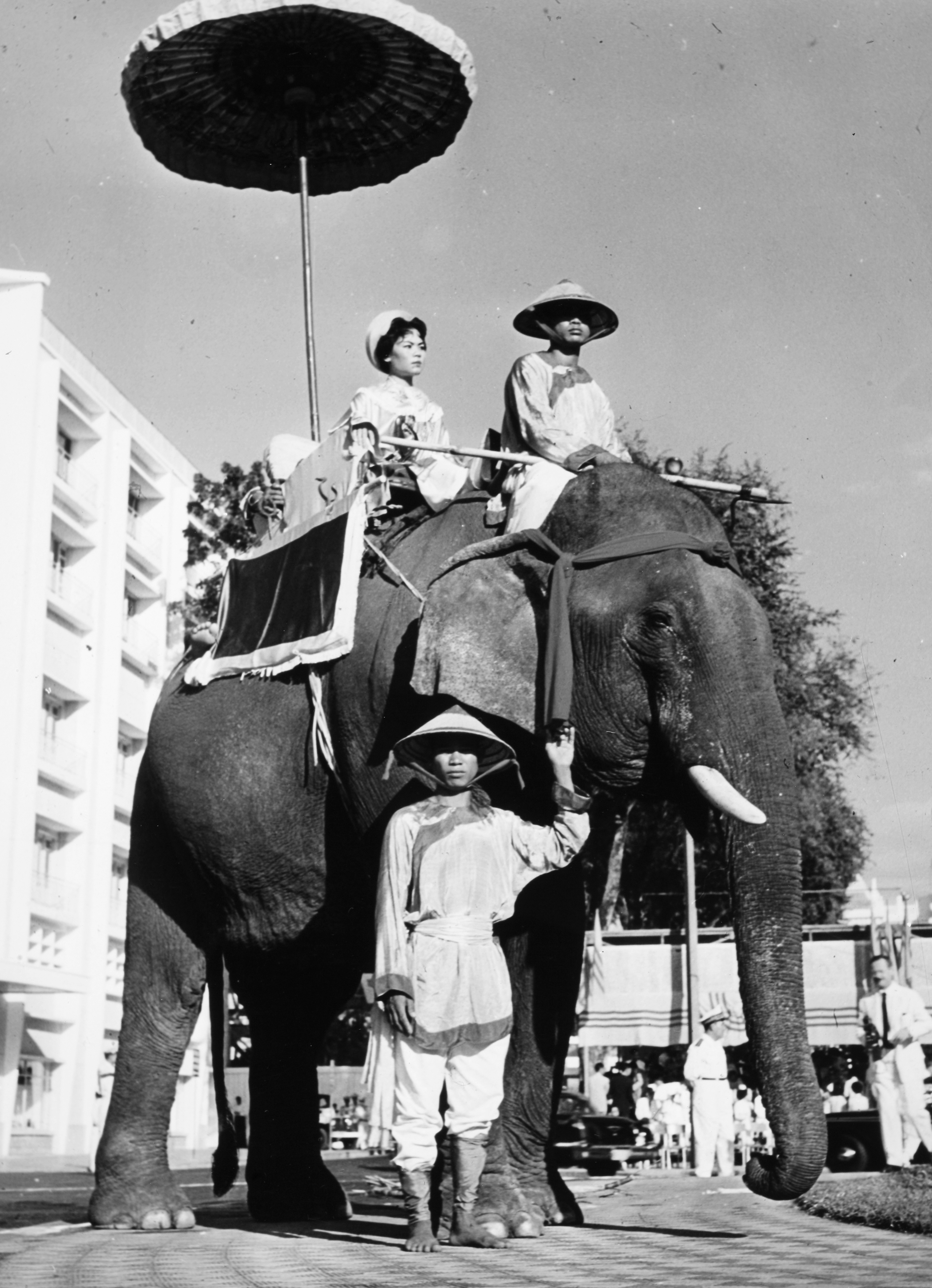
Trưng Sisters, national heroines of Vietnam are honoured with a parade of elephants and floats in Saigon, 1961

The third book of Đại Việt sử ký toàn thư (Complete Annals of Dai Viet), published in editions between 1272 and 1697, has the following to say about the Trưng Sisters:

In the year Kỉ Hợi [Ji Hai, 39 AD] (It was the 15th year of the era of Emperor Guang Wu of Han, Liu Xiu), the administrator of Jiaozhi, Su Ding, governed with greed and violence. Queen Trưng raised troops and attacked.

[...]

Queen Trưng reigned for three years. The queen was remarkably strong and courageous. She expelled Su Ding and established a nation as queen, but as a female ruler, she could not accomplish the rebuilding [of the nation]. Her taboo name was Trắc, and her family name was Trưng, but was originally Lạc (雒). (Note: or Hùng 雄(?)) She was the daughter of a Lạc general from Mê Linh from Phong Châu, and she was the wife of Thi Sách from Chu Diên County. Thi Sách was the son of another Lạc general, and the child of each of both houses married each other. ([Wang Youxue's] Collected Overview of the Outlines and Details (of the Comprehensive Mirror in Aid of Governance) ([資治通鑒]綱目集覽) erroneously indicated that his family name was Lạc.) Her capital was Mê Linh. [...]

Her first year was Canh Tí [Gengzi, 40 AD]. (It was the 16th year of Han dynasty's Jianwu era). In the spring, the second month, the queen was bitter because the governor, Su Ding, used the law to restrain her and also harbored a grudge against him for having killed her husband. She, therefore, along with her younger sister Nhị, rose and captured the commandery capital. Ding was forced to flee. Nam Hải, Cửu Chân, Nhật Nam, and Hợp Phố all rose in response to her. She was able to take over 65 cities and declare herself Queen. Thereafter, she began to use the family name of Trưng.

Her second year was Tân Sửu [Xinchou, 41 AD]. (It was the 17th year of Han dynasty's Jianwu era). In the spring, the second month, there was a solar eclipse on the last day of the (lunar) month. The Han court, witnessing that as Lady Trưng had declared herself queen, captured cities, caused much distress in the border commanderies, thus ordered Trường Sa, Hợp Phố, and Giao Châu ([now] ours) to prepare wagons and boats, repair the bridges and the roads, dredge the waterways, and store foods and provisions, and also commissioned Wave-Subduing General Ma Yuan and Fule marquis Liu Long as his assistant in order to invade.

Her third year was Nhâm Dần [Renyin, 42 AD]. (It was the 18th year of Han dynasty's Jianwu era). In the spring, the first month, Ma advanced, following the coastline and the mountain(paths). He went for over a thousand li and reached Lãng Bạc (west of Tây Nhai in La Thành was (a place) named Lãng Bạc). He battled with the queen, who saw that the enemy's army was large. She herself considered her army to be disorderly (Note: 自度烏合之衆, lit. "[the queen] [her]self considered [her] multitude to be like a murder of crows") and feared that it could not stand. Therefore, she withdrew to Forbidden (禁 Jìn) Gorge. (The Forbidden Gorge was referred to in history as Golden (金 Jīn) Gorge.) The army also thought that the queen was a woman and could not win, and therefore scattered. The national continuation again ended.

[...] (Note: Lê Văn Hưu's remark is entered here)

Her fourth year was Quý Mão [Guimao 43 AD]. (It was the 19th year of Han dynasty's Jianwu era). In the spring, the first moth, Queen Trưng and her younger sister warred against Han army; they were abandoned and both were defeated and perished. Ma Yuan chased down the remaining multitude, Đô Dương and others. When chased to Cư Phong prefecture, (Note: Possibly at Hải Vân Pass, see Lê Thành Khôi's Histoire du Viet Nam des origines a 1858 (Paris: Sudestasie, 1981)) [Đô Dương and others] surrendered.

[...]

The locals admired and mourned the Trưng Queens; they erected a temple for worshipping. The temple is located at in Hát River commune, Phúc Lộc Prefecture; there is also (another temple?) in the old territory of Phiên Ngung.

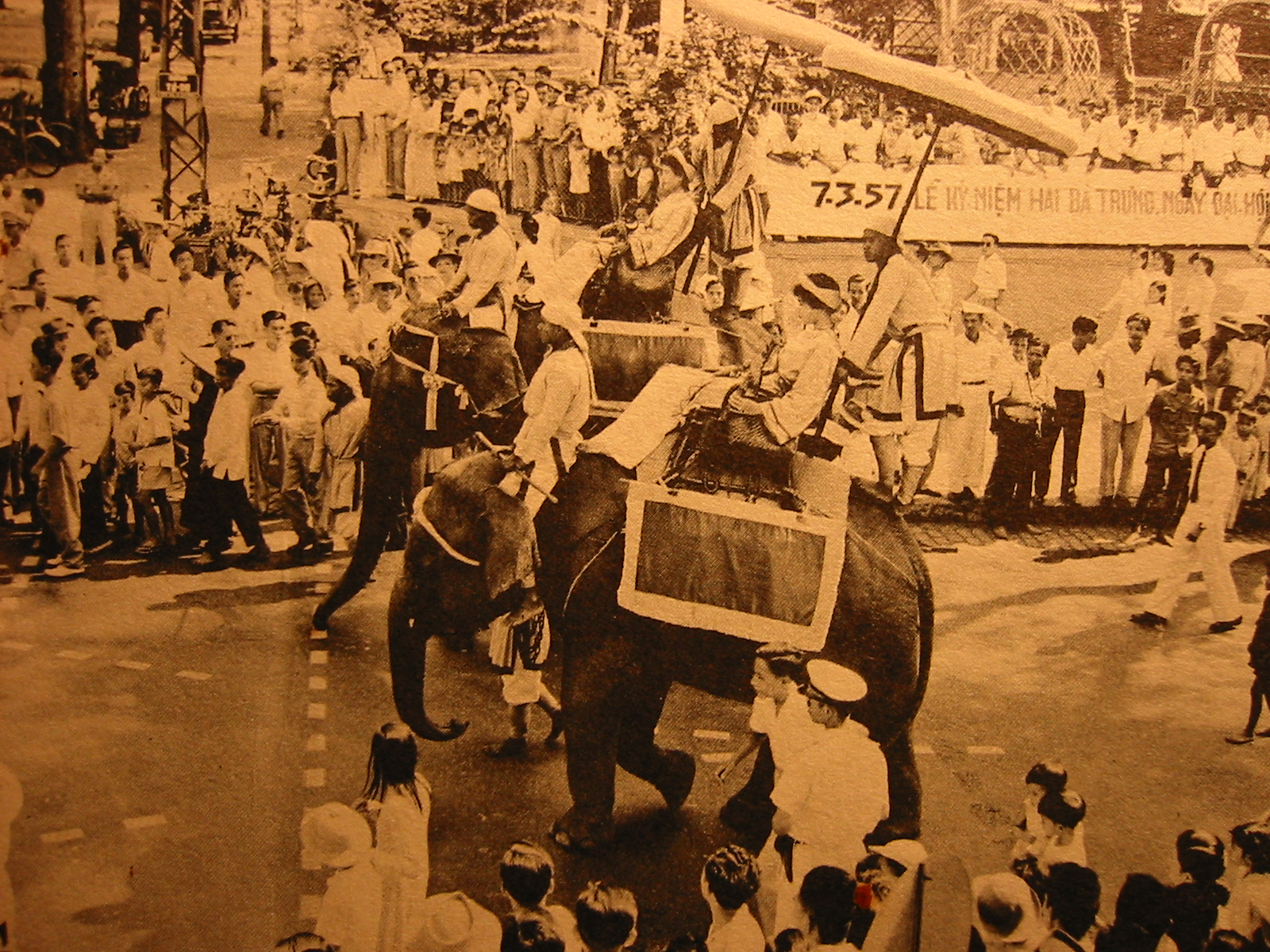
Procession of elephants in the Trưng Sisters' Parade in Saigon, 1957

Lê Văn Hưu (Trần dynasty's historian) wrote:

Trưng Trắc, Trưng Nhị are women; with one single cry [they rallied] the commanderies of Cửu Chân, Nhật Nam, Hợp Phố; and sixty-five strongholds beyond the ridge heeded their call. They established a nation and proclaimed themselves as queens as easily as their turning over their hands. We can see that we Viets have the potentials to achieve the status of hegemons and monarchs. Regrettably, since after the Triệu dynasty until before Ngô Quyền, in the span of more than one thousand years, the men themselves merely hung their heads, wrung their hands, and became vassals and servants to Northerners (Chinese). Don't they men feel ashamed considering that the two Trưng were women? Alas! They may say they have thrown themselves away. The reign of Trưng Queens started in the year of Canh Tý and ended in Nhâm Dần, for a total of 3 years (40–42).

Ngô Sĩ Liên (the Complete Annals chief compiler) wrote:

Lady Trưng was infuriated by the oppressive Han administrator. With her raised arm and one single yell, she almost rebuilt our Viet national continuation. Her heroic mettle during her lifetime not only prompted her nation-building and proclamation of queenship but also, even after she perished, hamper disaster and hinder peril. Whenever disasters, like flood or drought, happen, no prayers go unanswered. The same for the younger Trưng sister. For she, a woman, possessed the gentleman's virtue, and her heroic and courageous spirit, between heaven and earth, does not deteriorate even though her body alrealdy perished. Couldn't men have nourished that upright and honest spirit?

== Cultural significance ==
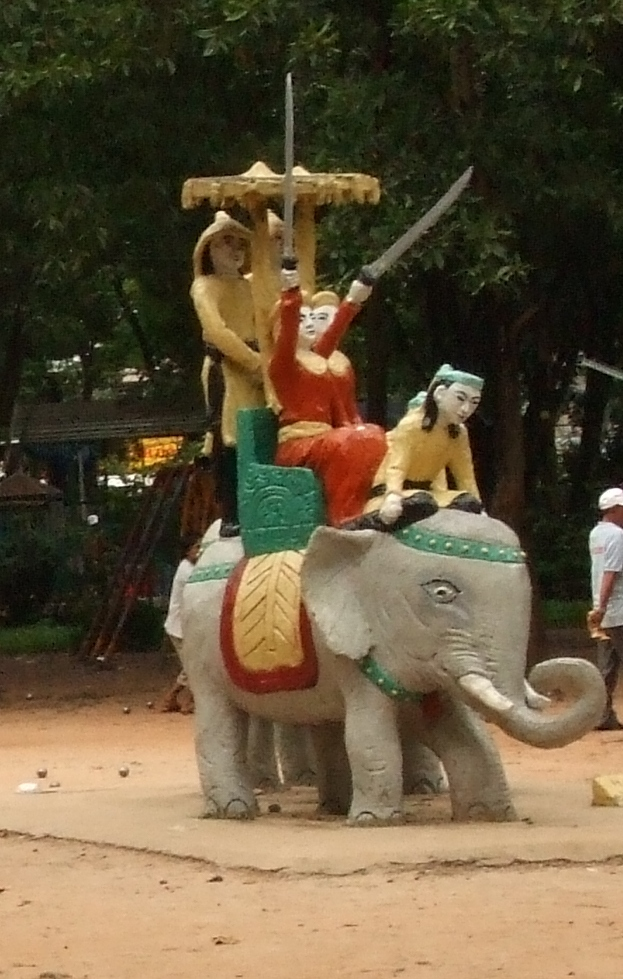
A statue of the Trưng Sisters in Ho Chi Minh City

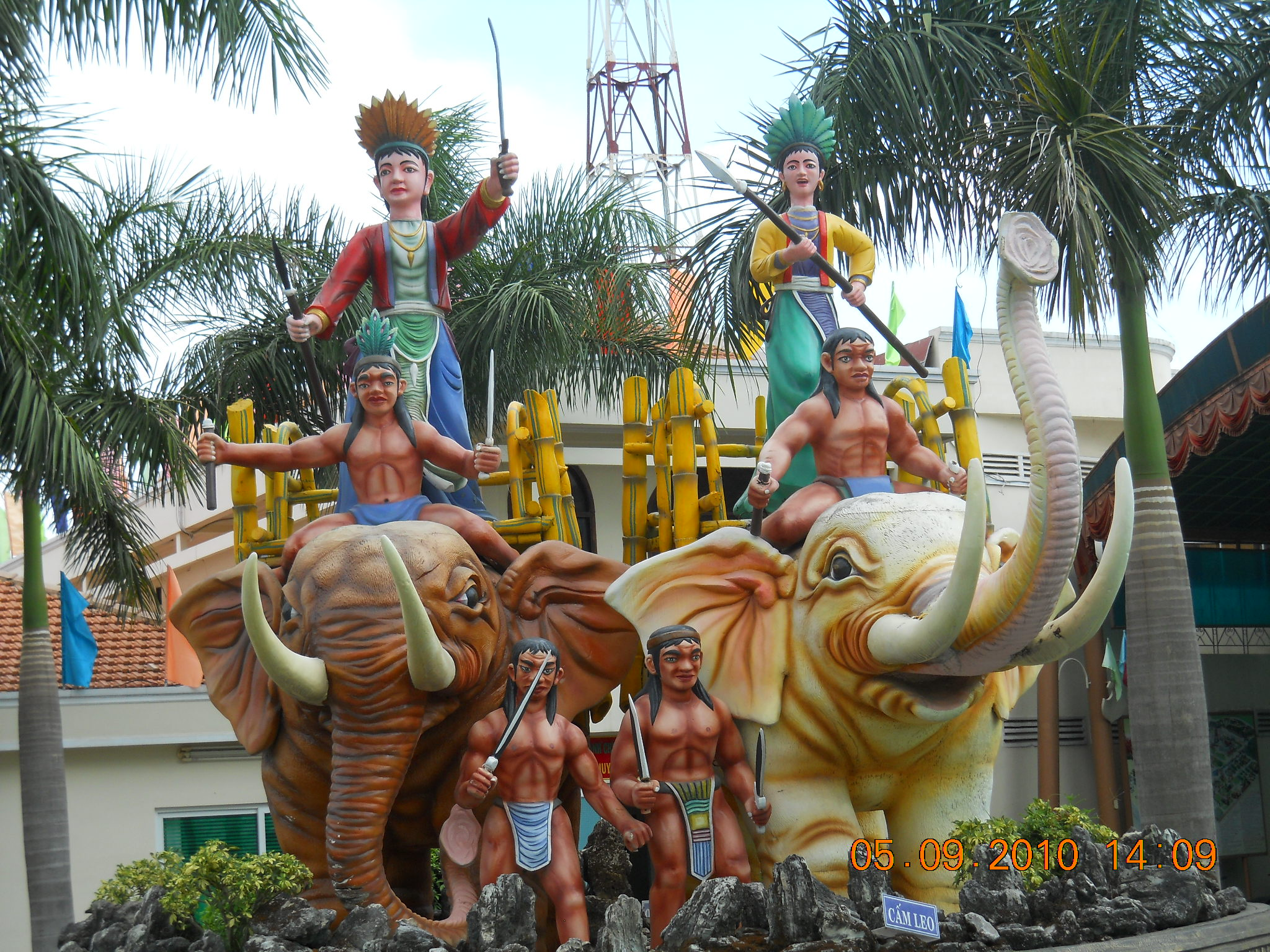
The statue of the Trưng Sisters at Suối Tiên park

The Trưng Sisters are revered in Vietnam, as they led the first resistance movement against the occupying Chinese after 247 years of domination. Some temples are dedicated to them, and a yearly holiday in February to commemorate their deaths is observed. A central district in Hanoi called the Hai Bà Trưng District is named after them, as are some streets in cities, and schools. Their biographies are mentioned in children's school books.

In 1962 during the Vietnam War, Trần Lệ Xuân (aka Madame Nhu), sister-in-law of South Vietnamese president Ngô Đình Diệm had a statue erected in the capital of Saigon in memory of the Trưng sisters, with the facial features modeled on herself, and also established the Women's Solidarity Movement, a female paramilitary organization, using the sisters as a rallying symbol. In the aftermath of the 1963 overthrow of Ngô Đình Diệm, the statues of the sisters were demolished by jubilant anti-Ngô Đình Diệm rioters.

=== Temples ===
Temples to the Trưng Sisters or Hai Bà Trưng Temples were found from as early as the end of the Third Era of Northern Domination. The best known Hai Bà Trưng Temple is in Hanoi near Hoàn Kiếm Lake. The temple was constructed by Emperor Lý Anh Tông (r. 1138–1176) in 1158. According to tradition, in that year a devastating drought occurred in the Red River Delta, and the emperor ordered a Buddhist monk named Cam Thin to conduct a sacrifices rite and pray for rain at the Trung sisters temple. It rained the following day that saved his realm from famine. During one night the emperor dreamed and saw the two sisters appeared and were riding together on an iron horse. When the emperor awoke, he ordered the temple to be gloriously decorated and performed a sacrifice ritual to the sisters. Later he directed two other temples to worship the sisters, one of which was destroyed by river landslide and one temple which survives.

=== Women's status ===
According to Keith Taylor, one reason for the defeat is desertion by rebels because they did not believe they could win under a woman's leadership. The fact that women were in charge was blamed as a reason for the defeat by historical Vietnamese texts in which the historians ridiculed and mocked men because they did nothing while "mere girls", whom they viewed with revulsion, took up the banner of revolt. The historical poem containing the phrase "mere girls", which related the revolt of the Trưng Sisters while the men did nothing, was not intended to praise women nor view war as women's work, as it has been wrongly interpreted.

== Notes ==
Preceded by First Chinese domination of Vietnam	Rulers of Vietnam; 40–43	Succeeded by Second Chinese domination of Vietnam
