= Timeline of Vietnamese history =

This is a timeline of Vietnamese history, comprising important legal and territorial changes and political events in Vietnam and its predecessor states. To read about the background to these events, see History of Vietnam.

== Prehistoric Vietnam ==
Year	Event
25000 BCE	The Soi Nhụ culture appeared.
23000 BCE	The Ngườm culture appeared.
20000 BCE	The Sơn Vi culture appeared in modern Lâm Thao district.
12000 BCE	Hoabinhian artifacts began to be produced in Northern Vietnam.
10000 BCE	The Bắc Sơn culture appeared.
8000 BCE	The Quỳnh Văn culture appeared.
5000 BCE	The Cái Bèo culture appeared.
4000 BCE	The first rice cultivation of which evidence survives in modern Vietnam took place.
4000 BCE	The Đa Bút culture appeared in what is now Vĩnh Lộc district.
3500 BCE	Wet rice was cultivated in the Red River Delta.

== 29th century BCE ==
Year	Event
2879 BCE	Kinh Dương Vương unified all vassal states in his territory into the single state of Xích Quỷ, which he ruled as Hùng king from the capital at Phong Châu. He also sponsored the development of martial arts in Xích Quỷ at the time.

== 28th century BCE ==
Year	Event
2793 BCE	Kinh Dương Vương was succeeded as Hùng king of Xích Quỷ, since renamed Văn Lang, by his son Lạc Long Quân.

== 27th century BCE ==
Year	Event
2637 BCE	The lunar calendar came into use in Văn Lang.

== 26th century BCE ==
Year	Event
2524 BCE	The first Hùng king of the Cấn line came to power in Văn Lang.

== 25th century BCE ==
Year	Event
2500 BCE	The Hùng king ordered an increase in rice cultivation.

== 23rd century BCE ==
Year	Event
2253 BCE	The last Hùng king of the Cấn line ended his rule of Văn Lang.
2252 BCE	The first Hùng king of the Chấn line came to power in Văn Lang.

== 22nd century BCE ==
Year	Event
2200 BCE	The earliest surviving artifacts indicating use of the Vietnamese calendar appeared.

== 20th century BCE ==
Year	Event
2000 BCE	The Phùng Nguyên culture appeared.
1913 BCE	The last Hùng king of the Chấn line ended his rule of Văn Lang.
1912 BCE	The first Hùng king of the Tốn line came to power in Văn Lang.

== 18th century BCE ==
Year	Event
1712 BCE	The first Hùng king of the Ly line came to power in Văn Lang.

== 17th century BCE ==
Year	Event
1700 BCE	Burial rituals and tomb building came into practice.
1631 BCE	The first Hùng king of the Khôn line came to power in Văn Lang.

== 15th century BCE ==
Year	Event
1500 BCE	The Đồng Đậu culture appeared.
1500 BCE	A sophisticated agricultural society developed on the Vietnamese coast.
1432 BCE	The last Hùng king of the Khôn line ended his rule of Văn Lang.
1431 BCE	The first Hùng king of the Đoài line came to power in Văn Lang.

== 14th century BCE ==
Year	Event
1331 BCE	The first Hùng king of the Giáp line came to power in Văn Lang.

== 13th century BCE ==
Year	Event	Date
1251 BCE	The first Hùng king of the Ất line came to power in Văn Lang.	

== 12th century BCE ==
Year	Event
1200 BCE	The Lạc Việt discovered bronze casting.
1200 BCE	Irrigation was first used in rice cultivation in the plains of the Mã and Red Rivers.
1162 BCE	The last Hùng king of the Ất line ended his rule of Văn Lang.
1161 BCE	The first Hùng king of the Bính line came to power in Văn Lang.

== 11th century BCE ==
Year	Event
1100 BCE	The Gò Mun culture appeared.
1055 BCE	The last Hùng king of the Bính line ended his rule of Văn Lang.
1054 BCE	The first Hùng king of the Đinh line came to power in Văn Lang.

== 10th century BCE ==
Year	Event
1000 BCE	The Đông Sơn culture appeared in the valley of the Red River.
1000 BCE	Copper casting began to be used in Văn Lang in the manufacture of brass tools, weapons, and ornaments.
1000 BCE	The population of Văn Lang reached one million.
1000 BCE	The Lạc Việt developed observational astronomy.
969 BCE	The last Hùng king of the Đinh line ended his rule of Văn Lang.
968 BCE	The first Hùng king of the Mậu line came to power in Văn Lang.

== 9th century BCE ==
Year	Event
853 BCE	The first Hùng king of the Kỷ line came to power in Văn Lang.

== 8th century BCE ==
Year	Event
754 BCE	The first Hùng king of the Canh line came to power in Văn Lang.

== 7th century BCE ==
Year	Event
700 BCE	Refugees from the increasingly fragile Zhou dynasty began to arrive in the Red River Delta.
661 BCE	The last Hùng king of the Canh line ended his rule of Văn Lang.
660 BCE	The first Hùng king of the Tân line came to power in Văn Lang.

== 6th century BCE ==
Year	Event
600 BCE	The metallurgical style unique to the Đông Sơn drums was invented.
600 BCE	An elaborate system of canals and dikes was invented which made possible the tidal irrigation of rice fields.
569 BCE	The last Hùng king of the Tân line ended his rule of Văn Lang.
568 BCE	The first Hùng king of the Nhâm line came to power in Văn Lang.

== 5th century BCE ==
Year	Event
500 BCE	The earliest artifacts suggesting the celebration of Tết appeared.
470 BCE	King Goujian of Yue sent messengers to Văn Lang demanding submission.
470 BCE	The last Hùng king of the Nhâm line ended his rule of Văn Lang.
408 BCE	Hùng Duệ Vương became Hùng king of Văn Lang.

== 4th century BCE ==
Year	Event
400 BCE	A mass migration of refugees to the Red River Delta took place due to the ongoing collapse of the Zhou dynasty.

== 3rd century BCE ==
Year	Event
300 BCE	Buddhist missionaries from Maurya Empire arrived in Văn Lang.
300 BCE	The Âu Việt settled across the northern border of Văn Lang and opened trade relations with the Lạc Việt.
257 BCE	Thục Phán, ruler of the Âu Việt, invaded and conquered Văn Lang. He renamed the country Âu Lạc and took the regnal name An Dương Vương, ruling as king from Cổ Loa Citadel.
250 BCE	The Hùng Temple was built.
210 BCE	The Battle of Tiên Du took place.
207 BCE	The Qin general Zhao Tuo captured Cổ Loa Citadel. An Dương Vương fled and later committed suicide.
207 BCE	Zhao Tuo divided the territory under his control into the commanderies of Jiaozhi and Jiuzhen.Chinese annals mark this as the start of Vietnamese history.
206 BCE	The warlord Xiang Yu led an army into the Qin capital Xianyang, burned the Epang Palace and killed the Qin emperor Ziying and the royal family.
203 BCE	Zhao Tuo declared himself king of Nanyue, with his capital in modern Panyu, Guangzhou.
203 BCE	Nanyue conquered Guilin.

== 2nd century BCE ==
Year	Date	Event
198 BCE		Two delegates were assigned to oversee the affairs of Jiaozhi and Jiuzhen.
196 BCE		The Han official Lu Jia gave Zhao Tuo a seal recognizing him as king of Nanyue in exchange for his nominal submission to the Han emperor.
183 BCE		Empress Lü, the Han empress dowager and regent for her grandson Emperor Houshao of Han, ordered a trade blockade of Nanyue.
183 BCE		Zhao Tuo sacked the Han capital Chang'an.
183 BCE		The nearby polities of Minyue, Yelang and Tongshi declared their allegiance to Nanyue.
181 BCE		A punitive Han invasion of Nanyue stalled after much of the invading army fell to illness.
180 BCE		Lü Zhi died. Nanyue conquered some Han territory near the border.
179 BCE		In exchange for the restoration of his family in modern Zhengding County and the withdrawal of Han forces from the Nanyue border, Zhao Tuo renounced the title emperor and pledged submission to the Han dynasty.
179 BCE		Luy Lâu was founded.
179 BCE		Zhao Tuo died. He was succeeded as king of Nanyue by his grandson Zhao Mo.
135 BCE		A border war took place between Nanyue and Minyue.
122 BCE		Zhao Mo died. He was succeeded as king of Nanyue by his eldest son Zhao Yingqi.
118 BCE		Confucian ideas were introduced to Nanyue.
115 BCE		Zhao Yingqi died. He was succeeded by his son Zhao Xing.
112 BCE		Lü Jia, the prime minister of Nanyue and a Lạc Việt chief, killed Zhao Xing and his Han Chinese mother Juishi after the latter agreed to full submission to the Han dynasty in order to preserve her authority in Nanyue. He declared Zhao Xing's elder brother Zhao Jiande king.
111 BCE		Han conquest of Nanyue: Han forces invaded Nanyue. Zhao Jiande was captured in flight and executed. The zhou of Jiaozhou was organized on the territory of the defunct Nanyue and divided into the commanderies of Nanhai, Cangwu, Yulin, Jiaozhi, Hepu, Zhuya, Taner, and Jiuzhen. Shi Dai was appointed its governor.
111 BCE		Tây Vu Vương launched a revolt against Han forces.
110 BCE		Tây Vu Vương was assassinated by his assistant Hoàng Đồng.

== 1st century BCE ==
Year	Date	Event
86 BCE		Shi Dai's rule of Jiaozhou ended.
48 BCE		The commandery of Rinan in Jiaozhou was organized south of the Hoành Sơn Range.

== 1st century ==
Year	Event
2	Tích Quang became governor of Jiaozhou.
2	A census in Jiaozhou counted some hundred thousand households and nearly one million people.
31	Tích Quang's rule of Jiaozhou ended.
34	Su Ding became governor of Jiaozhou.
39	Thi Sách was assassinated.
40	Trung sisters' rebellion: The Trưng Sisters launched a rebellion against Han authority in the Red River Delta.
43	Trung sisters' rebellion: the Trưng Sisters committed suicide by drowning themselves before The Han general Ma Yuan could capture them.

== 3rd century ==
Year	Date	Event
229	June 23	Sun Quan declared himself emperor, founding the state of Eastern Wu, separating from the Han dynasty.
246		Lady Triệu uprising.

== 6th century ==
Year	Date	Event
544	February	Following his rebellion and expulsion of Liang forces from Jiaozhou, Lý Nam Đế was proclaimed emperor of Vạn Xuân.
545	Winter	The Liang general Emperor Wu of Chen launched a surprise attack on the Vạn Xuân capital Long Biên, forcing Lý Nam Đế and the imperial administration to flee to the Gia Ninh Citadel in modern Việt Trì.
546		Lý Nam Đế was forced to retreat to Khuất Lão Cave, where he reorganized his army under the command of Triệu Việt Vương.
547		Vạn Xuân forces defended Dạ Trạch in modern Khoái Châu District from Liang forces.
548	February	Lý Nam Đế ceded rule of Vạn Xuân to Triệu Việt Vương and his older brother Lý Thiên Bảo.
548	April	Lý Nam Đế was assassinated in modern Laos.
550		Triệu Việt Vương expelled Liang forces from Vạn Xuân and reestablished the capital at Long Biên.
555		Lý Thiên Bảo died without heirs.
557		Hậu Lý Nam Đế, Lý Nam Đế's cousin and claimant to the throne of Vạn Xuân, signed a truce with Triệu Việt Vương establishing a boundary between their two territories.
571		Hậu Lý Nam Đế surprised and conquered Triệu Việt Vương and moved his capital to Phong Châu.

== 7th century ==
Year	Date	Event
602		Sui–Former Lý War: Sui conquered Vạn Xuân following a brief rebellion by Hậu Lý Nam Đế.

== 8th century ==
Year	Date	Event
713		Mai Thúc Loan uprising.
776		Phùng Hưng uprising.

== 10th century ==
Year	Date	Event
938		Battle of Bạch Đằng: Ngô Quyền defeated the Southern Han kingdom at the Battle of Bạch Đằng north of modern Haiphong and ended 1,000 years of Chinese domination dating back to 111 BC under the Han dynasty, founding the Ngô dynasty.
965		Anarchy of the 12 Warlords
979		Emperor Đinh Bộ Lĩnh of Đại Cồ Việt was assassinated along with his crown prince Đinh Liễn by a minor palace official. His surviving son, the young Đinh Phế Đế, succeeded him under the regency of the commander-in-chief Lê Hoàn.
979		Lê Hoàn declared himself viceroy of Đại Cồ Việt with the support of the empress dowager Dương Vân Nga.
979		The nobles Nguyễn Bặc and Đinh Điền attacked the Đại Cồ Việt capital Hoa Lư in response to Lê Hoàn's apparent usurpation.
979		Nguyễn Bặc and Đinh Điền were executed.
981		Lê Hoàn declared himself emperor at Hoa Lư.
981		Battle of Bạch Đằng (981): Đại Cồ Việt forces defeated a Song invasion near Lạng Sơn, forcing the Song fleet on the Bạch Đằng River to withdraw.
981		Nam quốc sơn hà, a poem celebrating the sovereignty of Đại Cồ Việt over its territory, was written.
982		Đại Cồ Việt forces sacked the Champa capital Indrapura.

== 11th century ==
Year	Date	Event
1005		Lê Hoàn died.
1009		The imperial court acclaimed Lý Thái Tổ emperor of Đại Cồ Việt.
1010	Autumn	Lý Thái Tổ issued the chiếu dời đô, an edict ordering the transfer of the capital from Hoa Lư to Đại La.
1028		Lý Thái Tổ's son Lý Thái Tông became emperor of Đại Cồ Việt.
1038		The Nùng warlord Nùng Tồn Phúc launched a failed rebellion against Lý Thái Tông.
1054		Lý Thái Tông died. He was succeeded by his son Lý Thánh Tông.
1070		The Temple of Literature, Hanoi, a Confucian temple, was constructed.
1072	January	Lý Thánh Tông died. He was succeeded as emperor by his young son Lý Nhân Tông, with the latter's mother Ỷ Lan and the chancellor Lý Đạo Thành acting as regents.
1075		Minor officials were chosen by examination for the first time.
1075	Autumn	Lý–Song War: Đại Cồ Việt invaded Song in response to a trade blockade.

== 12th century ==
Year	Date	Event
1127	15 January	Lý Nhân Tông died.
1176		The young Lý Cao Tông became emperor under the regency of Tô Hiến Thành.

== 13th century ==
Year	Date	Event
1209		The general Quách Bốc entered the capital, dethroned Lý Cao Tông and installed his young son Lý Thẩm as emperor.
1226	11 January	Trần Thái Tông was crowned emperor of Đại Việt.
1258	January	Mongol invasions of Vietnam: The Mongol Empire invaded Đại Việt and conquered the capital at modern Hanoi. Trần Thái Tông fled to an island.
1278	November	Trần Thánh Tông ceded the throne to his son Trần Nhân Tông.
1282		The Bình Than Conference took place.
1284		The Diên Hồng Conference took place.
1285		Mongol invasions of Vietnam: The Đại Việt commander-in-chief Trần Hưng Đạo drew out and harassed a Yuan invasion force, forcing their retreat.
1287		Mongol invasions of Vietnam: The Mongol navy was destroyed, forcing the army, left without provisions, to begin its retreat from Đại Việt.
1293	3 March	Trần Nhân Tông ceded the throne to his son Trần Anh Tông.

== 14th century ==
Year	Date	Event
1306		Trần Anh Tông's sister Huyền Trân married the Champa king Chế Mân in Huế.
1341		The young Trần Dụ Tông was crowned emperor of Đại Việt under the regency of his father, the retired emperor Trần Minh Tông.
1360		Champa launched several border attacks against Đại Việt.
1400		Hồ Quý Ly overthrew the Đại Việt emperor, enthroned himself, renamed the country Đại Ngu and moved the capital to the citadel of the Hồ dynasty.
1400		The Cham-Vietnamese War (1400–1407) began.

== 15th century ==
Year	Date	Event
1401		Hồ Quý Ly ceded the throne to his son Hồ Hán Thương.
1406	19 November	Ming–Hồ War: Ming forces captured the Đại Ngu capitals.
1428		Lê Lợi was declared emperor of an independent Đại Việt.
1428		The Bình Ngô đại cáo was published, affirming that Đại Việt was independent from and equal to China.
1460		Lê Thánh Tông was crowned emperor of Đại Việt.
1479		The Đại Việt sử ký toàn thư, an official history of Đại Việt, was completed.
1483		The Hồng Đức legal code was promulgated.
1497	30 January	Lê Thánh Tông died.

== 16th century ==
Year	Date	Event
1509		Lê Oanh assassinated his cousin, the tyrant Lê Uy Mục, and replaced him as emperor Lê Tương Dực.
1511		The Trần Tuân Uprising took place.
1516		Trần Cao rebellion: Trần Cao, a mandarin of Đại Việt who identified himself as an incarnation of Śakra, launched a revolt against the government.
1516		Portuguese seafarers arrived.
1516		Lê Tương Dực was murdered in the capital by a group of palace guards.
1527		Mạc Đăng Dung forced Emperor Lê Cung Hoàng to abdicate, establishing the Mạc dynasty.
1533		Lê–Mạc War.
1592		The Revival Lê dynasty defeated the Mạc dynasty and regained control of the country.

== 17th century ==
Year	Date	Event
1627		Trịnh–Nguyễn War.

== 18th century ==
Year	Date	Event
1778		The forces of the Tây Sơn dynasty took Gia Định in modern Saigon and massacred the Nguyễn lords, the de facto rulers of southern Đại Việt, sparing only the young Nguyễn Thế Tổ.
1778		Nguyễn Văn Nhạc proclaimed himself emperor of Đại Việt with his capital at Quy Nhơn.
1783		Nguyễn Thế Tổ fled the country.
1785	20 January	Battle of Rạch Gầm-Xoài Mút: Đại Việt forces under a banner of truce surprised and defeat a Siamese force, then invade with the intention of installing Nguyễn Thế Tổ on the throne, on the Mekong River in modern Tiền Giang Province.
1786		The Phú Xuân Campaign (1786) took place.
1786		The Thăng Long Campaign took place.
1787		The Nguyễn Nhạc-Nguyễn Huệ split occurred.
1787	21 November	The French priest Pierre Pigneau de Behaine signed the Treaty of Versailles on behalf of Nguyễn Thế Tổ. The French government agreed to support the latter in taking the throne of Đại Việt in exchange for Côn Sơn Island and exclusive trading rights.
1788	October	Battle of Ngọc Hồi-Đống Đa: Qing forces invaded Đại Việt in support of the deposed emperor Lê Chiêu Thống.
1788		Nguyễn Văn Nhạc's younger brother Nguyễn Văn Huệ proclaimed himself emperor of Đại Việt. Nguyễn Văn Nhạc relinquished the title, taking that of king instead.
1788		Nguyễn Thế Tổ conquered Gia Định in modern Saigon.
1790		The Battle of Bình Thuận took place.
1792		Nguyễn Văn Huệ died, probably from a stroke. He was succeeded by his young son Nguyễn Quang Toản.
1800		The Siege of Quy Nhơn took place.

== 19th century ==
Year	Date	Event
1801		Battle of Thị Nại.
1802		Battle of Trấn Ninh
1802		The Nguyễn defeat last of Tây Sơn forces.
1802		Capital moved to Huế.
1802		Emperor Cảnh Thịnh died, Emperor Gia Long became ruler of Vietnam.
1806		Tang thương ngẫu lục (Random Record of Great Changes) is finalized.
1809		Nguyễn Du completes The Tale of Kieu.
1815		Hoàng Việt law enforced.
1815		Emperor Gia Long (1802–1820) ended his rule of Vietnam.
1820		Emperor Minh Mạng (1820–1841) became ruler of Vietnam.
1825		Phan Bá Vành Uprising.
1833		Nông Văn Vân Uprising.
1833		Lê Văn Khôi Revolt.
1833		Emperor Minh Mạng (1820–1841) ended his rule of Vietnam.
1845		Emperor Thiệu Trị (1841–1847) became ruler of Vietnam.
1845		USS Constitution lands in Da Nang as a company of US Marines moves overland to Huế and rescues a French Bishop who had been captured by the Vietnamese.
1847		French bombardment of Da Nang in response to persecution of Catholic missionaries.
1847		Emperor Thiệu Trị (1841–1847) ended his rule of Vietnam.
1854		Emperor Tự Đức (1847–1883) became ruler of Vietnam.
1854		Cao Bá Quát Uprising.
1858		Cochinchina Campaign.
1859		Thủ Khoa Huân Uprising.
1861		Sinking of L'Esperance
1861		Trương Định Uprising.
1862		Treaty of Saigon.
1867		The French establishes the colony of Cochinchina.
1880s		Discovery of Quang Yen coalfield
1883		Emperor Tự Đức (1847–1883) ended his rule of Vietnam.
1885		Ruler: Emperor Hàm Nghi (1884–1885)
1885		Battle of the Huế Imperial City. Hàm Nghi leads resistance.
1885		Emperor Đồng Khánh (1885–1889) became ruler of Vietnam.
1885		Cần Vương Movement.
1888		Hàm Nghi captured and exiled to Algeria.
1888		Emperor Đồng Khánh (1885–1889) ended his rule of Vietnam.

== 20th century ==
- Films about Vietnamese history

Year	Date	Event
1904		Ruler: Emperor Thành Thái (1889–1907)
1904		Đông Du Movement.
1906		The Duy Tân movement, initiated by Phan Châu Trinh, was launched.
1917		Ruler: Emperor Khải Định (1916–1925)
1917		Thái Nguyên uprising.
1930		Emperor Bảo Đại (r. 1926–1945) became ruler of Vietnam.
1930		Nghệ Tĩnh Revolt.
1930	3 February	Communist Party of Vietnam (CPV) is the founding and ruling communist party of the Socialist Republic of Vietnam.
1945	11 March	The Empire of Vietnam is established under Japanese sponsorship.
1945	16–30 August	August Revolution by the Viet Minh. Emperor Bảo Đại abdicates. Civil conflicts in Vietnam (1945–1949) begins.
1945	September	Allied forces disarm the Japanese in Indochina after World War II, with British-Indian troops operating south of the 16th parallel and Chinese nationalist forces operating north of the 16th parallel.
1949	July 2	The State of Vietnam is established within the French Union.
1954	13 March	Battle of Dien Bien Phu: French troops begin the battle against the Viet Minh in Dien Bien Phu.
1954	23 March	Battle of Dien Bien Phu: the Viet Minh capture the main airstrip of Dien Bien Phu. The remaining French Army units there are partially isolated.
1954	26 April	An international conference on Korea and Indo-China opens in Geneva.
1954	7 May	Battle of Dien Bien Phu ends in a French defeat.
1954	21 July	The Geneva Conference sends French Union forces to the south, and Viet Minh forces to the north, of a ceasefire line, and calls for elections to decide the government for all of Vietnam by July 1956. Failure to abide by the terms of the agreement leads to the establishment de facto of regimes of North Vietnam and South Vietnam, and the Vietnam War.
1954	1 August	The First Indochina War ends with the Vietnam People's Army in North Vietnam, the Vietnamese National Army in South Vietnam, the Kingdom of Cambodia in Cambodia, and the Kingdom of Laos in Laos, emerging victorious against the French Army.
1955	26 October	Ngô Đình Diệm proclaims Vietnam to be a republic with himself as its President (following the State of Vietnam referendum on 23 October) and forms the Army of the Republic of Vietnam.
1955	1 November	The Vietnam War begins between North Vietnam and South Vietnam; the north is allied with the Viet Cong.
1959	26 September	First large unit action of the Vietnam War takes place, when two companies of the ARVN 23d Division are ambushed by a well-organized Viet Cong force of several hundred, identified as the "2d Liberation Battalion".
1960	6 March	Vietnam War: The United States announces that 3,500 American soldiers will be sent to Vietnam.
1961	18 November	Vietnam War: U.S. President John F. Kennedy sends 18,000 military advisors to South Vietnam.
1961	11 December	The American involvement in the Vietnam War officially begins, as the first American helicopters arrive in Saigon along with 400 U.S. personnel.
1963	2 January	Vietnam War: The Viet Cong win their first major victory in the Battle of Ap Bac.
1963	8 May	Huế Phật Đản shootings: The Army of the Republic of Vietnam opens fire on Buddhists who defy a ban on the flying of the Buddhist flag on Vesak, the birthday of Gautama Buddha, killing 9. Earlier, President Ngô Đình Diệm allowed the flying of the Vatican flag in honour of his brother, Archbishop Ngô Đình Thục, triggering the Buddhist crisis in South Vietnam.
1963	3 June	Huế chemical attacks: The Army of the Republic of Vietnam rains liquid chemicals on the heads of Buddhist protestors, injuring 67 people. The United States threatens to cut off aid to the regime of Ngô Đình Diệm.
1963	11 June	Thích Quảng Đức, Vietnamese Buddhist monk (suicide).
1963	7 July	Double Seven Day scuffle: Secret police loyal to Ngô Đình Nhu, brother of President Ngô Đình Diệm, attack American journalists including Peter Arnett and David Halberstam at a demonstration during the Buddhist crisis in South Vietnam.
1963	21 August	Xá Lợi Pagoda raids: The Army of the Republic of Vietnam Special Forces loyal to Ngô Đình Nhu, brother of President Ngô Đình Diệm, vandalise Buddhist pagodas across South Vietnam, arresting thousands and leaving an estimated hundreds dead. In the wake of the raids, the Kennedy administration by Cable 243 orders the Embassy of the United States, Saigon to explore alternative leadership in the country, opening the way towards a coup against Diệm.
1963	2 November	1963 South Vietnamese coup d'état: Arrest and assassination of Ngo Dinh Diem, the South Vietnamese President.
1963	6 November	1963 South Vietnamese coup d'état: Coup leader General Dương Văn Minh takes over as leader of South Vietnam.
1964	30 January	General Nguyễn Khánh leads a bloodless military coup d'état, replacing Dương Văn Minh as Prime Minister of South Vietnam.
1964	2 May	Vietnam War: Attack on USNS Card – An explosion caused by Viet Cong commandos causes escort carrier USNS Card to sink in the port of Saigon.
1964	19 July	Vietnam War: At a rally in Saigon, South Vietnamese Prime Minister Nguyễn Khánh calls for expanding the war into North Vietnam.
1964	20 July	Vietnam War: Viet Cong forces attack a provincial capital, killing 11 South Vietnamese military personnel and 40 civilians (30 of which are children).
1964	27 July	Vietnam War: The U.S. sends 5,000 more military advisers to South Vietnam, bringing the total number of United States forces in Vietnam to 21,000.
1964	2 August	Vietnam War: United States destroyer Maddox is attacked in the Gulf of Tonkin. Air support from the carrier USS Ticonderoga sinks one gunboat, while the other two leave the battle.
1964	5 August	Vietnam War: Operation Pierce Arrow – Aircraft from carriers USS Ticonderoga and USS Constellation bomb North Vietnam in retaliation for strikes against U.S. destroyers in the Gulf of Tonkin.
1964	7 August	Vietnam War: The United States Congress passes the Gulf of Tonkin Resolution, giving U.S. President Lyndon B. Johnson broad war powers to deal with North Vietnamese attacks on U.S. forces.
1964	16 August	Vietnam War: In a coup, General Nguyễn Khánh replaces Dương Văn Minh as South Vietnam's chief of state and establishes a new constitution, drafted partly by the U.S. Embassy.
1965		Vietnam War: Korean People's Army Air Force sent 200 pilots to Vietnam.
1965	2 March	Vietnam War: Operation Rolling Thunder – The United States Air Force 2nd Air Division, United States Navy and South Vietnam Air Force begin a 3½-year aerial bombardment campaign against North Vietnam.
1965	8 March	Vietnam War: Some 3,500 United States Marines arrive in Da Nang, South Vietnam, becoming the first American ground combat troops in Vietnam.
1965	29 April	Australia announces that it is sending an infantry battalion to support the South Vietnam government.
1965	10 June	Vietnam War – Battle of Đồng Xoài: About 1,500 Viet Cong mount a mortar attack on Đồng Xoài, overrunning its military headquarters and the adjoining militia compound.
1965	24 July	Vietnam War: Four F-4C Phantoms escorting a bombing raid at Kang Chi are targeted by antiaircraft missiles, in the first such attack against American planes in the war. One is shot down and the other 3 sustain damage.
1965	28 July	Vietnam War: U.S. President Lyndon B. Johnson announces his order to increase the number of United States troops in South Vietnam from 75,000 to 125,000, and to more than double the number of men drafted per month - from 17,000 to 35,000.
1965	18 August	Vietnam War – Operation Starlite: 5,500 United States Marines destroy a Viet Cong stronghold on the Van Tuong peninsula in Quảng Ngãi Province, in the first major American ground battle of the war. The Marines were tipped-off by a Viet Cong deserter who said that there was an attack planned against the U.S. base at Chu Lai.
1965	20 September	Vietnam War: An USAF F-104 Starfighter piloted by Captain Philip Eldon Smith is shot down by a Chinese MiG-19 Farmer. The pilot is held until 15 March 1973.
1965	9 October	A brigade of South Korean soldiers arrive in South Vietnam.
1965	30 October	Vietnam War: Near Da Nang, United States Marines repel an intense attack by Viet Cong forces, killing 56 guerrillas. A sketch of Marine positions is found on the dead body of a 13-year-old Vietnamese boy who sold drinks to the Marines the day before.
1965	8 November	Vietnam War – Operation Hump: The United States Army 173rd Airborne is ambushed by over 1,200 Viet Cong.
1965	14 November	Vietnam War – Battle of Ia Drang: In the Ia Drang Valley of the Central Highlands in Vietnam, the first major engagement of the war between regular United States and North Vietnamese forces begins.
1965	28 November	Vietnam War: In response to U.S. President Lyndon B. Johnson's call for "more flags" in Vietnam, Philippines President-elect Ferdinand Marcos announces he will send troops to help fight in South Vietnam.
1965	21 December	The Soviet Union announces that it has shipped rockets to North Vietnam.
1966	15 May	The South Vietnamese army besieges Da Nang.
1966	29 June	Vietnam War: U.S. planes begin bombing Hanoi and Haiphong.
1966	4 July	North Vietnam declares general mobilization.
1966	7 July	A Warsaw Pact conference ends with a promise to support North Vietnam.
1966	24 July	A USAF F-4C Phantom #63-7599 was shot down by a North Vietnamese SAM-2 45 miles (72 km) northeast of Hanoi, in the first loss of a US aircraft to a Vietnamese SAM in the Vietnam War.
1966	18 August	Vietnam War – Battle of Long Tan: D Company, 6th Battalion of the Royal Australian Regiment, meets and defeats a Viet Cong force estimated to be four times larger, in Phuoc Tuy Province, Republic of Vietnam.
1966	16 September	In South Vietnam, Thích Trí Quang ends a 100-day hunger strike.
1966	9 October	Vietnam War: Bình Tai massacre.
1966	24 October	Negotiations about the Vietnam War begin in Manila, Philippines.
1966	6 December	Vietnam War: Bình Hòa massacre.
1967	6 January	Vietnam War: USMC and ARVN troops launch Operation Deckhouse Five in the Mekong Delta.
1967	8 January	Vietnam War: Operation Cedar Falls starts.
1967	7 August	Vietnam War: The People's Republic of China agrees to give North Vietnam an undisclosed amount of aid in the form of a grant.
1967	21 August	Two U.S. Navy jets stray into the airspace of the People's Republic of China following an attack on a target in North Vietnam and are shot down. Lt. Robert J. Flynn, the only survivor, is captured alive and will be held prisoner by China until 1973.
1967	3 September	Nguyễn Văn Thiệu is elected President of South Vietnam.
1967	4–15 September	Vietnam War – Operation Swift: The United States Marines launch a search and destroy mission in Quảng Nam and Quảng Tín provinces. The ensuing 4-day battle in Que Son Valley kills 114 Americans and 376 North Vietnamese.
1967	17 October	Vietnam War: The Battle of Ong Thanh takes place.
1967	26 October	U.S. Navy pilot John McCain is shot down over North Vietnam and taken prisoner. His capture is confirmed two days later, and he remains a prisoner of war for more than five years.
1967	3–23 November	Vietnam War – Battle of Dak To: Around Đắk Tô (located about 280 miles north of Saigon near the Cambodian border), heavy casualties are suffered on both sides; U.S. troops narrowly win the battle on 22 November.
1967	4 December	Vietnam War: U.S. and South Vietnamese forces engage Viet Cong troops in the Mekong Delta (235 of the 300-strong Viet Cong battalion are killed).
1968	21 January	Vietnam War – Battle of Khe Sanh: One of the most publicized and controversial battles of the war begins, ending on 9 July.
1968	30 January	Vietnam War: The Tet Offensive begins, as Viet Cong forces launch a series of surprise attacks across South Vietnam.
1968	1 February	Vietnam War: A Viet Cong officer named Nguyễn Văn Lém is executed by Nguyễn Ngọc Loan, a South Vietnamese National Police Chief. The event is photographed by Eddie Adams. The photo makes headlines around the world, eventually winning the 1969 Pulitzer Prize, and sways U.S. public opinion against the war.
1968	12 February	Vietnam War: Phong Nhị and Phong Nhất massacre.
1968	24 February	Vietnam War: The Tet Offensive is halted; South Vietnam recaptures Huế.
1968	25 February	Vietnam War: Hà My massacre.
1968	1–30 March	Vietnam War: Operation Patrick.
1968	7 March	Vietnam War: The First Battle of Saigon ends.
1968	10–11 March	Vietnam War: Battle of Lima Site 85, the largest single ground combat loss of United States Air Force members (12) during the (at this time) secret war later known as the Laotian Civil War.
1968	16 March	Vietnam War – My Lai massacre: American troops kill scores of civilians. The story will first become public in November 1969 and will help undermine public support for the U.S. efforts in Vietnam.
1968	30 March	Vietnam War: Operation Cochise Green starts.
1968	26 July	Vietnam War: South Vietnamese opposition leader Trương Đình Dzu is sentenced to 5 years hard labor, for advocating the formation of a coalition government as a way to move toward an end to the war.
1968	23 September	Vietnam War: The Tet Offensive comes to an end in South Vietnam.
1968	8 October	Vietnam War – Operation Sealords: United States and South Vietnamese forces launch a new operation in the Mekong Delta.
1968	31 October	Vietnam War: Citing progress in the Paris peace talks, U.S. President Lyndon B. Johnson announces to the nation that he has ordered a complete cessation of "all air, naval, and artillery bombardment of North Vietnam" effective 1 November.
1968	15 November	Vietnam War: Operation Commando Hunt is initiated to interdict men and supplies on the Ho Chi Minh trail, through Laos into South Vietnam. By the end of the operation, 3 million tons of bombs are dropped on Laos, slowing but not seriously disrupting trail operations.
1969	13–20 May	The Battle of Hamburger Hill, also known as Dong Ap Bia, begins during the Vietnam War.
1969	8 June	U.S. President Richard Nixon and South Vietnamese President Nguyễn Văn Thiệu meet at Midway Island. Nixon announces that 25,000 U.S. troops will be withdrawn by September.
1969	8 July	Vietnam War: The very first U.S. troop withdrawals are made.
1969	25 July	Vietnam War: U.S. President Richard Nixon declares the Nixon Doctrine, stating that the United States now expects its Asian allies to take care of their own military defense. This starts the "Vietnamization" of the war.
1969	2 September	Ho Chi Minh, the president of the North Vietnam, dies at the age of 79.
1970	5 September	Vietnam War – Operation Jefferson Glenn: The United States 101st Airborne Division and the South Vietnamese 1st Infantry Division initiate a new operation in Thua Thien Province (the operation ends in October 1971).
1970	12 October	Vietnam War: U.S. President Richard Nixon announces that the United States will withdraw 40,000 more troops before Christmas.
1970	30 October	In Vietnam, the worst monsoon to hit the area in six years causes large floods, kills 293, leaves 200,000 homeless and virtually halts the Vietnam War.
1970	4 November	Vietnam War – Vietnamization: The United States turns control of the air base in the Mekong Delta to South Vietnam.
1970	21 November	Vietnam War – Operation Ivory Coast: A joint Air Force and Army team raids the Sơn Tây prison camp in an attempt to free American POWs thought to be held there (no Americans are killed, but the prisoners have already moved to another camp; all U.S. POWs are moved to a handful of central prison complexes as a result of this raid).
1971	13 February	Vietnam War: Backed by American air and artillery support, South Vietnamese troops invade Laos.
1971	18 August	Vietnam War: Australia and New Zealand decide to withdraw their troops from Vietnam.
1971	29 October	Vietnam War – Vietnamization: The total number of American troops still in Vietnam drops to a record low of 196,700 (the lowest since January 1966).
1971	12 November	Vietnam War – Vietnamization: U.S. President Richard M. Nixon sets 1 February 1972, as the deadline for the removal of another 45,000 American troops from Vietnam.
1972	24 February	North Vietnamese negotiators walk out of the Paris Peace Talks to protest U.S. air raids.
1972	30 March	Vietnam War: The Easter Offensive begins after North Vietnamese forces cross into the Demilitarized Zone (DMZ) of South Vietnam (ends in October 1972)
1972	16 April	Vietnam War – Nguyen Hue Offensive: Prompted by the North Vietnamese offensive, the United States resumes bombing of Hanoi and Haiphong.
1972	8 May	U.S. President Richard Nixon orders the mining of Haiphong Harbor in Vietnam.
1972	10 May	Operation Linebacker and Operation Custom Tailor begin with large-scale bombing operations against North Vietnam by tactical fighter aircraft.
1972	8 June	Vietnam War: Associated Press photographer Nick Ut takes his Pulitzer Prize-winning photograph of a naked nine-year-old Phan Thi Kim Phuc running down a road after being burned by napalm.
1972		U.S. actress Jane Fonda tours North Vietnam, during which she is photographed sitting on a North Vietnamese anti-aircraft gun.
1972	26 October	Following a visit to South Vietnam, U.S. National Security Advisor Henry Kissinger suggests that "peace is at hand."
1972	11 November	Vietnam War – Vietnamization: The United States Army turns over the massive Long Binh military base to South Vietnam.
1972	22 November	Vietnam War: The United States loses its first B-52 Stratofortress of the war.
1972	25 December	The Christmas bombing of North Vietnam causes widespread criticism of the U.S. and President Richard Nixon.
1973	15 January	Vietnam War: Citing progress in peace negotiations, U.S. President Richard Nixon announces the suspension of offensive action in North Vietnam.
1973	27 January	U.S. involvement in the Vietnam War ends with the signing of the Paris Peace Accords.
1973	29 March	The last United States soldier leaves Vietnam.
1973	15 August	The U.S. bombing of Cambodia ends, officially halting 12 years of combat activity in Southeast Asia according to the Case–Church Amendment-an act that prohibits military operations in Laos, Cambodia, and North and South Vietnam as a follow-up of the Paris Peace Accords.
1974	19 January	Vietnam War: The battle of the Paracel Islands between People's Republic of China and South Vietnam. This is the most famous and the only major battle involve China in Vietnam War.
1975	20 January	In Hanoi, North Vietnam, the Politburo approves the final military offensive against South Vietnam.
1975	10 March	Vietnam War: North Vietnamese troops attack Ban Mê Thuột, South Vietnam, on their way to capturing Saigon.
1975	13 March	Vietnam War: South Vietnam President Nguyễn Văn Thiệu orders the Central Highlands evacuated. This turns into a mass exodus involving troops and civilians (the Convoy of Tears).
1975	4 April	Vietnam War: The first military Operation Babylift flight, C5A 80218, crashes 27 minutes after takeoff, killing 138 on board; 176 survive the crash.
1975	25 April	Vietnam War: As North Vietnamese Army forces close in on the South Vietnamese capital Saigon, the Australian Embassy is closed and evacuated, almost 10 years to the day since the first Australian troop commitment to South Vietnam.
1975	29 April	Vietnam War: Operation Frequent Wind – Americans and their allies are evacuated from South Vietnam by helicopter.; North Vietnam concludes its East Sea Campaign by capturing all of the Spratly Islands that were being held by South Vietnam.
1975	30 April	The Vietnam War ends with the Fall of Saigon: The Vietnam War concludes as Communist forces from North Vietnam take Saigon, resulting in mass evacuation of the remaining American troops and South Vietnam civilians. As the capital is taken, South Vietnam surrenders unconditionally and is replaced with the temporary Provisional Government.
1975	1 May	The Cold War between Cambodia and Vietnam begins, which eventually leads to the Cambodian–Vietnamese War.
1976		President Tôn Đức Thắng (1976–1980) became ruler of Vietnam.
1976	2 July	The National Assembly proclaims unification of the country as the Socialist Republic of Vietnam.
1976		Fourth National Party Congress. The Vietnamese Workers Party renamed the Vietnam Communist Party.
1977	20 September	Admittance to United Nations.
1978		Admittance to the Comecon.
1978		25-year "Treaty of Friendship and Cooperation" with the Soviet Union.
1978	25 December	Vietnam launches a major offensive against the Khmer Rouge of Cambodia.
1979	17-20 February	The People's Republic of China invades northern Vietnam, launching the Sino-Vietnamese War. The war ended with no border changes on 16 March. Vietnamese government signs treaty with Cambodia regime lifts blockade of the Cambodian coast same day.
1979		President Tôn Đức Thắng (1976–1980) ended his rule of Vietnam.
1980		Ruler: President Nguyễn Hữu Thọ (1980–1981)
1982		Trường Chinh, Chairman of the State Council (1981–1987) became ruler of Vietnam.
1982	March	Fifth National Party Congress.
1986	December	Sixth National Party Congress. Trường Chinh, Chairman of the State Council (1981–1987) ended his rule of Vietnam. Đổi Mới begins.
1988		Võ Chí Công, Chairman of the State Council (1987–1992) became ruler of Vietnam.
1988	March	Johnson South Reef skirmish.
1991	June	Seventh National Party Congress.
1991		Võ Chí Công, Chairman of the State Council (1987–1992) ended his rule of Vietnam.
1991		Dissolution of the Soviet Union ends the existence of the Soviet Union and aid throughout Vietnam.
1995		President Lê Đức Anh (1992–1997) became ruler of Vietnam.
1995	28 July	Admittance to ASEAN.
1996		Eighth National Party Congress.
1996		President Lê Đức Anh (1992–1997) ended his rule of Vietnam.

== 21st century ==
Year	Date	Event
2001	April	Ninth National Party Congress.
2002		President Trần Đức Lương starts his second term.
2006	April	Tenth National Party Congress.
2006		Trần Đức Lương (1997–2006) resigns as President of Vietnam, replaced by Nguyễn Minh Triết.
2007		Admittance to World Trade Organization.
2011	January	Eleventh National Party Congress.
2011		President Nguyễn Minh Triết (2006–2011) ends his term, replaced by Trương Tấn Sang.
2013		Amendment of Constitution. Democratic recommendations are ignored by the National Assembly. The new constitution comes into effect on the first day of next year.
2014	May–July	Hai Yang Shi You 981 standoff: Tensions arises from the Chinese state-owned China National Offshore Oil Corporation moving its Hai Yang Shi You 981 oil platform to waters near the disputed Paracel Islands, resulting in large anti-China protests across Vietnam.
2015	1 January	Vietnam's new marriage law goes into effect. Same-sex marriages are no longer prohibited, but are not recognized as being legally valid.
2016	January	Twelfth National Party Congress.
2016		President Trương Tấn Sang (2011–2016) ends his term, replaced by Trần Đại Quang.
2016	April–July	2016 Vietnam marine life disaster.
2020		First year of the COVID-19 pandemic in Vietnam.
2021	January	Thirteenth National Party Congress. Unprecedented third term of the CPV General Secretary Nguyễn Phú Trọng starts.
2021		The COVID-19 situations worsen significantly, particularly in Ho Chi Minh City.
2022		Việt Á scandal, 'Rescue flights' scandal, and other corporate scandals are exposed.
2023	January	Nguyễn Xuân Phúc resigns as President of Vietnam, replaced by Võ Văn Thưởng.
2024		Trial of Trương Mỹ Lan and Van Thinh Phat Holdings Group.
2024	March	Võ Văn Thưởng resigns as President of Vietnam, replaced by Tô Lâm.
2024	July	CPV General Secretary Nguyễn Phú Trọng dies in his third term. Tô Lâm succeeds.
2024	October	Tô Lâm resigns as President of Vietnam, replaced by Lương Cường.
2025	July	Following the merger of administrative units, Vietnam has 34 provincial-level units, comprising 28 provinces and 6 centrally governed cities.
2026	January	Fourteenth National Party Congress.

== See also ==
- Timeline of Vietnam under Chinese rule
- Timeline of early independent Vietnam
- Timeline of the Lý dynasty
