= Giáp line =

Ninth dynasty of the Hùng kings

Giáp line Ninth dynasty of Hùng kings 支甲 Chi Giáp
- 1331 – 1252 B.C.
- Capital: Phong Châu
- Government: Monarchy
- Hùng king
  - 1331 BC–: Quân Lang
- Historical era: Hồng Bàng period
  - Established: 1331 B.C.
  - Disestablished: 1252 B.C.
Preceded by	Succeeded by
Đoài line	Ất line

The Giáp line (Vietnamese: chi Giáp; chữ Hán: 支甲; chi can also be translated to as branch) was the ninth dynasty of Hùng kings of the Hồng Bàng period of Văn Lang (now Viet Nam). Starting 1331 B.C., the line refers to the rule of Quân Lang and his successors, when the seat of government was centered at Phú Thọ.

== History ==
Quân Lang (Note: Another spelling for the name is "Quốc Lang".) was born approximately 1375 B.C., and took the regnal name of Hùng Định Vương (雄定王) upon becoming Hùng king. The series of all Hùng kings following Quân Lang took that same regnal name of Hùng Định Vương to rule over Văn Lang until approximately 1252 B.C.

The Đồng Đậu culture strongly influenced the processes involved in making ceramic of this period.

== Bibliography ==
- Nguyễn Khắc Thuần (2008). Thế thứ các triều vua Việt Nam. Giáo Dục Publisher.
