= Bính line =

Dynasty in what is now Vietnam (1161–1055 BCE)

Bính line Eleventh dynasty of Hùng kings 支丙 Chi Bính
- 1161 – 1055 B.C.
- Capital: Phong Châu
- Government: Monarchy
- Hùng king
  - 1161 BC–: Hưng Đức Lang
- Historical era: Hồng Bàng period
  - Established: 1161 B.C.
  - Disestablished: 1055 B.C.
Preceded by	Succeeded by
Ất line	Đinh line

The Bính line (Vietnamese: chi Bính; chữ Hán: 支丙; chi can also be translated to as branch) was the eleventh dynasty of Hùng kings of the Hồng Bàng period of Văn Lang (now Viet Nam). Starting 1161 B.C., the line refers to the rule of Hưng Đức Lang and his successors.

== History ==
Hưng Đức Lang was born approximately 1211 B.C., and took the regnal name of Hùng Trinh Vương (Note: Another spellings for the name are "Hùng Chinh Vương".) upon becoming Hùng king. The series of all Hùng kings following Hưng Đức Lang took that same regnal name of Hùng Trinh Vương to rule over Văn Lang until approximately 1055 B.C.

Approximately 1100-1000 B.C., as part of the later epoch of the Bronze Age, this period was characterized by the remarkable use of Bronze in tool making and weaponry replacing earlier use of stone. This was a rebirth for the civilization settled in Viet Nam.

== Bibliography ==
- Nguyễn Khắc Thuần (2008). Thế thứ các triều vua Việt Nam. Giáo Dục Publisher.
