= Đoài line =

Đoài line Eighth dynasty of Hùng kings 支兌 Chi Đoài
- 1431 – 1332 B.C.
- Capital: Phong Châu
- Government: Monarchy
- Hùng king
  - 1431 BC–: Thừa Vân Lang
- Historical era: Hồng Bàng period
  - End of the Khôn line: 1431 B.C.
  - Beginning of the Giáp line: 1332 B.C.
Preceded by	Succeeded by
Khôn line	Giáp line

The Đoài line (Vietnamese: chi Đoài; chữ Hán: 支兌; chi can also be translated to as branch) was the eighth dynasty of Hùng kings of the Hồng Bàng period of Văn Lang (now Vietnam). Starting 1431 B.C., the line refers to the rule of Thừa Vân Lang and his successors, when the seat of government was centered at Phú Thọ.

== History ==
Thừa Vân Lang was born approximately 1466 B.C. and took the regnal name of Hùng Vỹ Vương (Note: Another spellings for the name are "Hùng Vi Vương" and "Hùng Vĩ Vương".) upon becoming Hùng king. The series of all Hùng kings following Thừa Vân Lang took that same regnal name of Hùng Vỹ Vương to rule over Văn Lang until approximately 1332 B.C.

== Bibliography ==
- Nguyễn Khắc Thuần (2008). Thế thứ các triều vua Việt Nam. Giáo Dục Publisher.
