= Chấn line =

Chấn line Fourth dynasty of Hùng kings 支震 Chi Chấn
- 2252–1913 BC
- Capital: Phong Châu
- Government: Monarchy
- Hùng king
  - 2252 BC–: Hùng Diệp vương(雄曄王), Bửu Lang
- Historical era: Hồng Bàng period
  - End of the Cấn line: 2252 BC
  - Beginning of the Tốn line: 1913 BC
Preceded by	Succeeded by
Cấn line	Tốn line

The Chấn line (Vietnamese: chi Chấn; chữ Hán: 支震; chi can also be translated to as branch) was the fourth dynasty of Hùng kings of the Hồng Bàng period of Văn Lang (now Vietnam). Starting 2252 BC, the line refers to the rule of Bửu Lang and his successors, when the seat of government was centered at Phú Thọ.

== History ==
Bửu Lang (Note: Another name is "Bảo Lang".) (year of birth unknown) took the regnal name of Hùng Diệp Vương (雄曄王) (Note: Another spellings for the name are "Hùng Việp Vương" and "Hùng Hoa Vương".) upon becoming Hùng king. The series of all Hùng kings following Bửu Lang took that same regnal name of Hùng Diệp Vương to rule over Văn Lang until approximately 1913 BC.

The burial customs of this period were that the bodies lay straight. But a sick deceased was usually laid to rest curled in the fetal position.

The evidence for early Vietnamese calendar system was recorded on stone tools dating back 2200–2000 BC. Parallel lines were carved on the stone tools as a counting instrument involving the lunar calendar.

Sometime around 2000 BC, the Phùng Nguyên culture arose and lasted about 1000 years. At the end of its time, it must have overlapped with the cultures of the later period.

Also during this time, population from the mountainous areas moved out and began to settle in the open along the rivers to join the agricultural activities. The slash-and-burn method was introduced to create fields. In addition, the population started to raise their own animals. Archaeologists had discovered the remains of domesticated animals.

== Bibliography ==
- Nguyen Ba Khoach (1978). "Phung Nguyen". ScholarSpace - University of Hawaii.
- Nguyễn Khắc Thuần (2008). Thế thứ các triều vua Việt Nam. Giáo Dục Publisher.
