= Ất line =

Ất line Tenth dynasty of Hùng kings 支乙 Chi Ất
- 1251 – 1162 B.C.
- Capital: Phong Châu
- Government: Monarchy
- Hùng king
  - 1251 BC–: Hùng Hải Lang
- Historical era: Hồng Bàng period
  - Established: 1251 B.C.
  - Disestablished: 1162 B.C.
Preceded by	Succeeded by
Giáp line	Bính line

The Ất line (Vietnamese: chi Ất; chữ Hán: 支乙; chi can also be translated to as branch) was the tenth dynasty of Hùng kings of the Hồng Bàng period of Văn Lang (now Viet Nam). Starting 1251 B.C., the line refers to the rule of Hùng Hải Lang and his successors, when the seat of government was centered at Việt Trì.

== History ==
Hùng Hải Lang was born approximately 1287 B.C., and took the regnal name of Hùng Uy Vương (Note: Another spellings for the name are "Hùng Nghi Vương" and "Hùng Hy Vương" (the word "Hy" here is not the same as that of Tốn line's Hùng Hy Vương.) upon becoming Hùng king. The series of all Hùng kings following Hùng Hải Lang took that same regnal name of Hùng Uy Vương to rule over Văn Lang until approximately 1162 B.C.

By about 1200 B.C., a new phase of development of wet-rice cultivation and bronze casting occurred in the Ma River and Red River plains. These developments later contributed to the rise of the Đông Sơn culture, notable for its elaborate bronze drums.

== Bibliography ==
- Nguyễn Khắc Thuần (2008). Thế thứ các triều vua Việt Nam. Giáo Dục Publisher.
