= Quỳnh Văn culture =

The Quỳnh Văn culture is the name given to a period of the Neolithic Age in Vietnam, after the name of the site in vi:Quỳnh Văn.
