= Tân line =

Sixteenth dynasty of Hùng kings of the Hồng Bàng period of Văn Lang

Tân line Sixteenth dynasty of Hùng kings 支辛 Chi Tân
- 660 – 569 B.C.
- Government: Monarchy
- Hùng king
  - 660 BC–: Đức Quân Lang
- Historical era: Hồng Bàng period
  - Established: 660 B.C.
  - Disestablished: 569 B.C.
Preceded by	Succeeded by
Canh line	Nhâm line

The Tân line (Vietnamese: chi Tân; chữ Hán: 支辛; chi can also be translated to as branch) was the sixteenth dynasty of Hùng kings of the Hồng Bàng period of Văn Lang (now Viet Nam). Starting 660 B.C., the line refers to the rule of Đức Quân Lang and his successors.

== History ==
Đức Quân Lang was born approximately 712 B.C., and took the regnal name of Hùng Tạo Vương (雄造王) upon becoming Hùng king. The series of all Hùng kings following Đức Quân Lang took that same regnal name of Hùng Tạo Vương to rule over Văn Lang until approximately 569 B.C.

During this period, local leaders rose in rebellion against the Hùng king' government in what legend accounts called it the "Man rebellion." It ended as the rebels surrendered due to the suppression by the forces of General Thạch Tướng.

Perhaps a little before 600 BC, the metallurgical style unique to the Đông Sơn drums was invented.

An important aspect of Vietnamese culture by the sixth century B.C. was the tidal irrigation of rice fields through an elaborate system of canals and dikes. The fields were called Lạc fields.

== Bibliography ==
- Cao Xuân Đỉnh. Người anh hùng làng Dóng. NxbKHXH 1969.
- Nguyễn Khắc Thuần (2008). Thế thứ các triều vua Việt Nam. Giáo Dục Publisher.
- Tarling, Nicholas. The Cambridge History of Southeast Asia. Cambridge University Press, 1999.
