= Cấn line =

Cấn line Third dynasty of Hùng kings 支艮 Chi Cấn
- 2524 – 2253 BC
- Capital: Phong Châu
- Government: Monarchy
- Hùng king
  - 2524 BC–: Hùng Lân vương(雄麟王), Lân Lang
- Historical era: Hồng Bàng period
  - End of the Khảm line: 2524 BC
  - Beginning of the Chấn line: 2253 BC
| Preceded by | Succeeded by |
| Khảm line | Chấn line |

The Cấn line (Vietnamese: chi Cấn; chữ Hán: 支艮; chi can also be translated to as branch) was the third dynasty of Hùng kings of the Hồng Bàng period of Văn Lang (now Viet Nam). Starting 2524 BC, the line refers to the rule of Lân Lang and his successors, when the seat of government was moved to what is today Phú Thọ.

== History ==
Lân Lang was born approximately 2570 BC, and took the regnal name of Hùng Quốc Vương (雄國王) upon becoming Hùng king. The series of all Hùng kings following Hùng Lân took that same regnal name of Hùng Quốc Vương to rule over Văn Lang until approximately 2253 BC.

Lân Lang later changed the national appellation from Xích Quỷ to Văn Lang. Since this time the different ethnic minorities of Vietnam were formed. The administrative rule of the Lạc tướng, Bố chính, and Lạc hầu was promulgated.

Around 2500 BC, the Hùng king expanded rice cultivation.

== Bibliography ==
- Nguyễn Khắc Thuần (2008). Thế thứ các triều vua Việt Nam. Giáo Dục Publisher.
