= Mậu line =

Mậu line Thirteenth dynasty of Hùng kings 支戊 Chi Mậu
- 968 – 854 B.C.
- Government: Monarchy
- Hùng king
  - 968 BC–: Tuấn Lang
- Historical era: Hồng Bàng period
  - Established: 968 B.C.
  - Disestablished: 854 B.C.
Preceded by	Succeeded by
Đinh line	Kỷ line

The Mậu line (Vietnamese: chi Mậu; chữ Hán: 支戊; chi can also be translated to as branch) was the thirteenth dynasty of Hùng kings of the Hồng Bàng period of Văn Lang (now Viet Nam). Starting 968 B.C., the line refers to the rule of Tuấn Lang and his successors.

== History ==
Tuấn Lang was born approximately 990 B.C., and took the regnal name of Hùng Việt Vương (雄越王) upon becoming Hùng king. The series of all Hùng kings following Tuấn Lang took that same regnal name of Hùng Việt Vương to rule over Văn Lang until approximately 854 B.C.

== Bibliography ==
- Nguyễn Khắc Thuần (2008). Thế thứ các triều vua Việt Nam. Giáo Dục Publisher.
