= Canh line =

Canh line Fifteenth dynasty of Hùng kings 支庚 Chi Canh
- 754 – 661 BC
- Government: Monarchy
- Hùng king
  - 754 BC–: Cảnh Chiêu Lang
- Historical era: Hồng Bàng period
  - Established: 754 BC
  - Disestablished: 661 BC
Preceded by	Succeeded by
Kỷ line	Tân line

The Canh line (Vietnamese: chi Canh; chữ Hán: 支庚; chi can also be translated to as branch) was the fifteenth dynasty of Hùng kings of the Hồng Bàng period of Văn Lang (now Viet Nam). Starting 754 BC, the line refers to the rule of Cảnh Chiêu Lang and his successors. It is best known as the period when the Lạc Việt made their appearance in Văn Lang and whose influence was an important one on Vietnamese history.

== History ==
Cảnh Chiêu Lang took the regnal name of Hùng Triệu Vương (雄朝王) (Note: Another spelling for the name is "Hùng Triều Vương".) upon becoming Hùng king. The series of all Hùng kings following Cảnh Chiêu Lang took that same regnal name of Hùng Triệu Vương to rule over Văn Lang until approximately 661 BC.

During this period, at a regional level, Văn Lang was divided into as many as 15 administrative regions called bộs each still governed by a Lạc tướng. Hùng Vương (English: Hùng King) became a form of address for a person who was king.

The Hùng kings of this line restored a single strong kingship as part of the Đông Sơn period, and initiating another glorious chapter in Vietnamese history, as the Vietnamese people increasingly identified with the Đông Sơn culture.

The 7th century BC witnessed the process of migration of Lạc Việt refugees who fled the Spring and Autumn period to Văn Lang. The Lạc Việt were a people from East Asia. The migrant people finally settled in the Red River Delta. Slowly, the Lạc Việt settlers would grasp power over Văn Lang.

== Bibliography ==
- Đào Duy Anh. Đất nước Việt Nam qua các đời. NXB VHTT, 2005.
- Hauptly, Denis J. (1985), In Vietnam, New York.
- Nguyễn Khắc Thuần (2008). Thế thứ các triều vua Việt Nam. Giáo Dục Publisher.
- Sloper, David W (1995). Higher Education in Vietnam: Change and Response. Institute of Southeast Asian, 1995 - 20c.
