= Kỷ line =

Kỷ line Fourteenth dynasty of Hùng kings 支己 Chi Kỷ
- 853 – 755 B.C.
- Government: Monarchy
- Hùng king
  - 853 BC–: Chân Nhân Lang
- Historical era: Hồng Bàng period
  - Established: 853 B.C.
  - Disestablished: 755 B.C.
Preceded by	Succeeded by
Mậu line	Canh line

The Kỷ line (Vietnamese: chi Kỷ; chữ Hán: 支己; chi can also be translated to as branch) was the fourteenth dynasty of Hùng kings of the Hồng Bàng period of Văn Lang (now Viet Nam). Starting 853 B.C., the line refers to the rule of Chân Nhân Lang and his successors.

== History ==
Chân Nhân Lang was born approximately 894 B.C., and took the regnal name of Hùng Anh Vương(雄英王) upon becoming Hùng king. The series of all Hùng kings following Chân Nhân Lang took that same regnal name of Hùng Anh Vương to rule over Văn Lang until approximately 755 B.C.

During this period, Vietnamese Bronze Age culture further flourished and attained an unprecedented level of realism. Excavations of ancient sites indicate that a new large, centrally organized state in the Red River Delta emerged around 800 BC, during the early phase of a time known as the Đông Sơn period.

The Vietnamese increasingly built dikes and canals to control the rivers of the delta. They used the tides of the sea to irrigate their rice fields, and crafted bronze drums, tools, and weapons. By protecting the land from floods and droughts and by irrigating, the Vietnamese produced dependable harvests.

== Bibliography ==
- Nguyễn Khắc Thuần (2008). Thế thứ các triều vua Việt Nam. Giáo Dục Publisher.
- Taus-Bolstad, Stacy. Vietnam in Pictures. Twenty-First Century Books, Jan 1, 2003 - Juvenile Nonfiction.
