= Hùng king =

Vietnamese rulers of the Hồng Bàng period

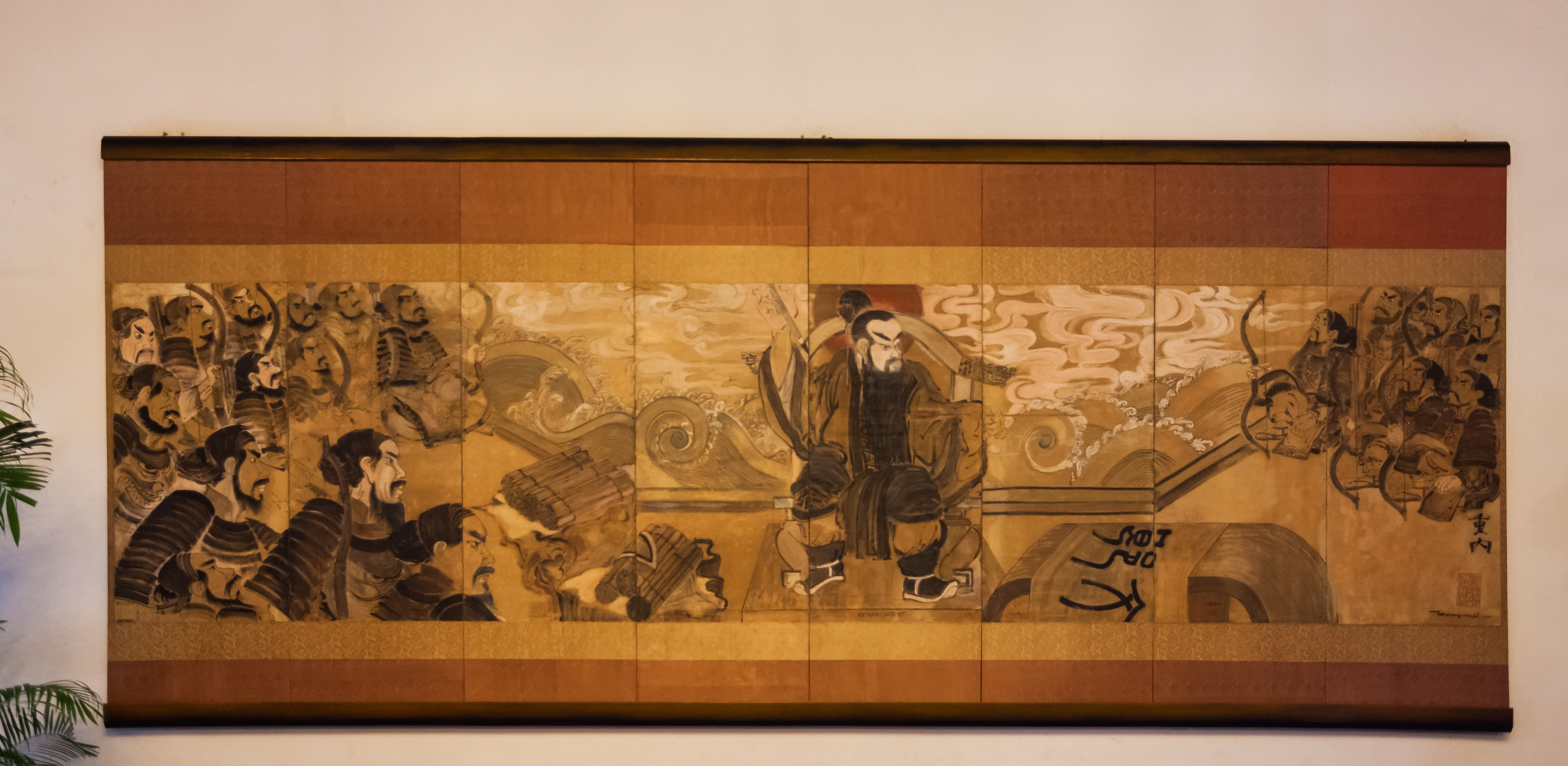
"Quốc tổ Hùng Vương" by Trọng Nội, 1966, displayed at Independence Palace, Ho Chi Minh City

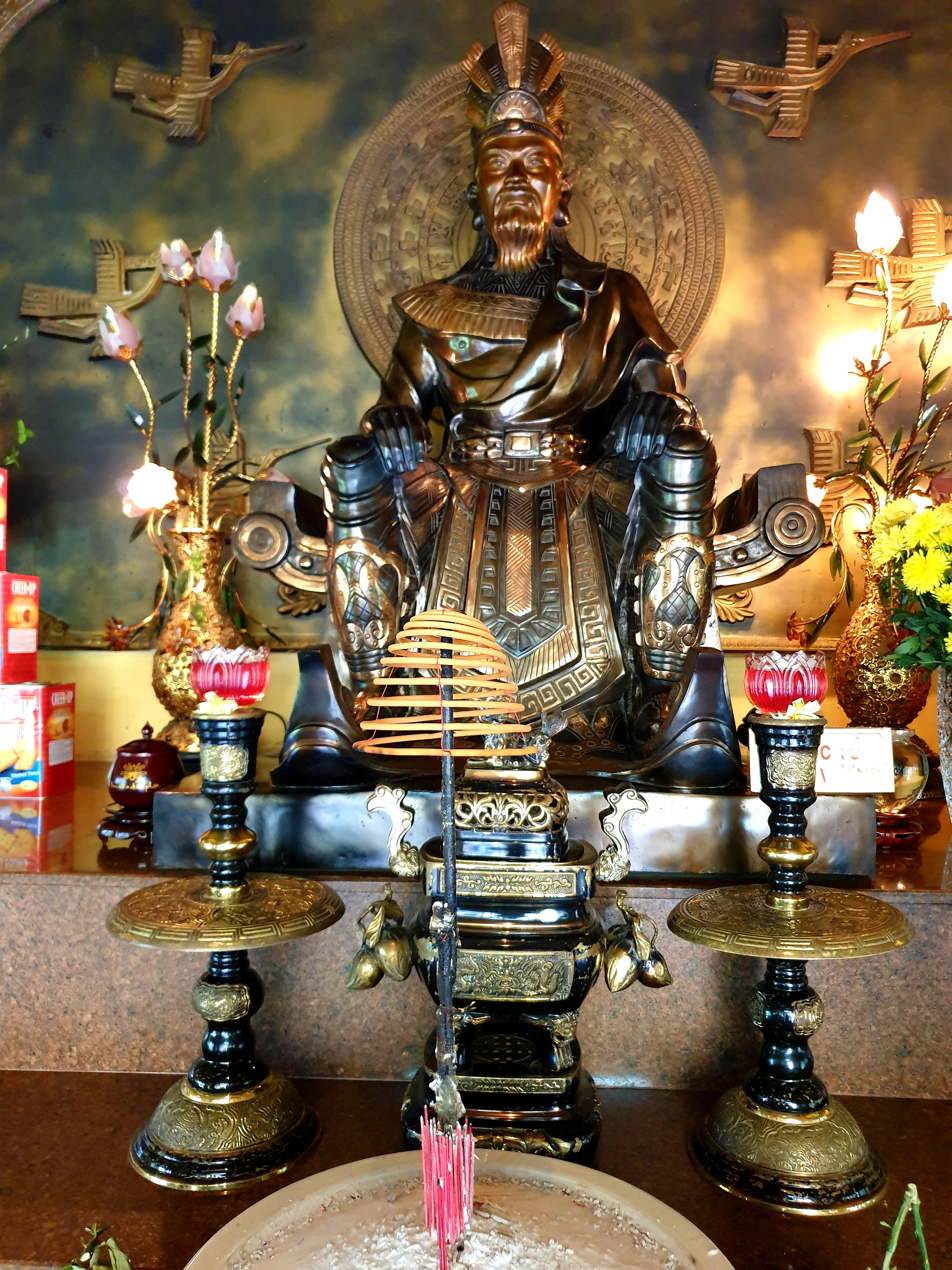
Statue of Hùng Vương at Hùng Temple, Tao Đàn, HCMC

Hùng king (2879 BC – 258 BC; Chữ Hán: 雄王; Vietnamese: Hùng Vương (雄王) or vua Hùng (𤤰雄); Vương means king and vua means monarch, also commonly translated as emperor or king) is the title given to the ancient Vietnamese rulers of the Hồng Bàng period.

== Traditional Vietnamese account ==
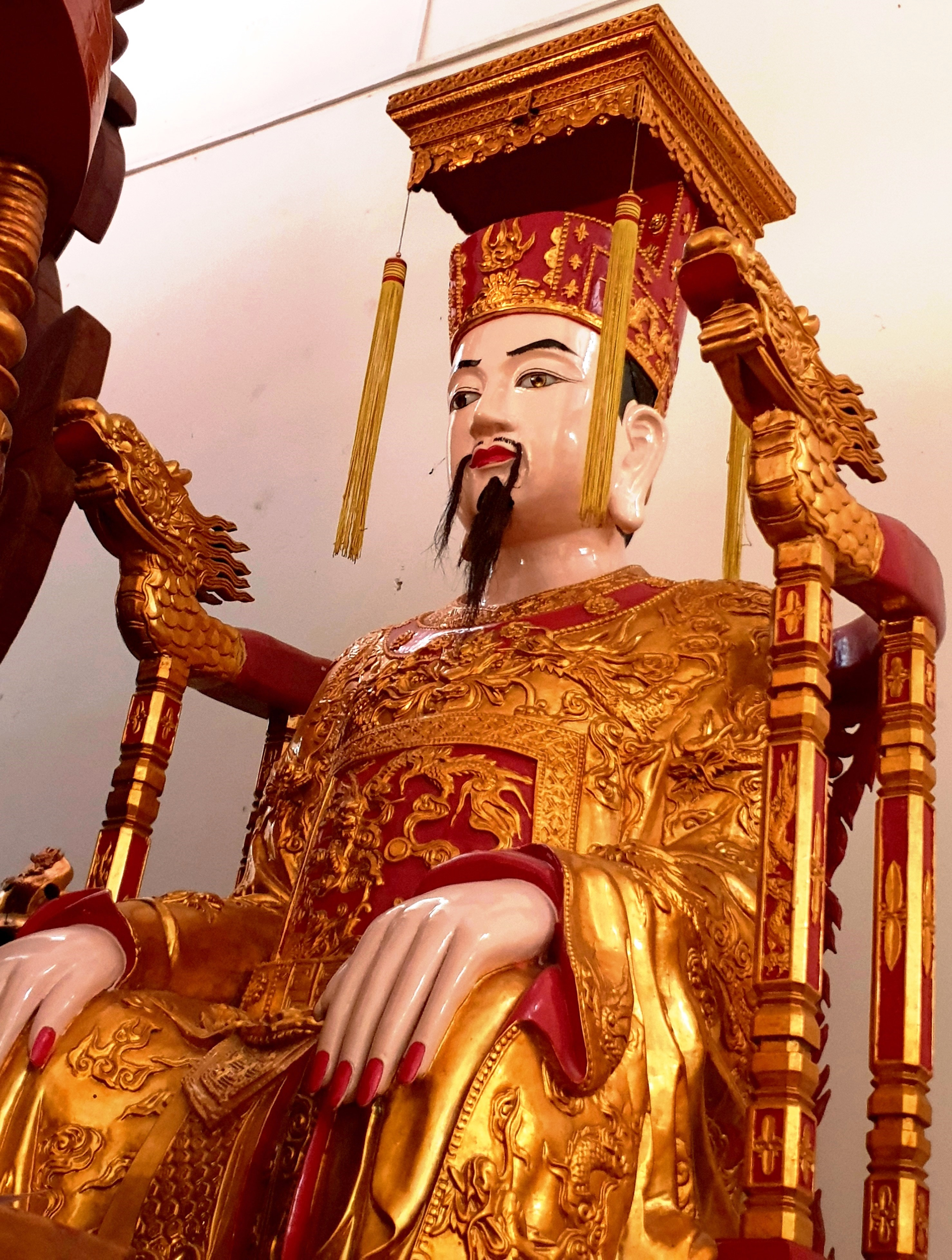
Hùng Vương statue in traditional style at Giác Hải Temple

=== Etymology ===
It is likely that the name Hùng Vương is a combination of the two Sino-Vietnamese words Hùng 雄 "masculine, virile, fierce, powerful, grand" and Vương 王, which means "king". The name Hùng Vương might have originally been a title bestowed on a chieftain. The Hùng Vương was allegedly the head chieftain of Văn Lang which at the time was composed of feudal communities of rice farmers.

=== Hùng kings' narrative ===
According to the Hùng kings narrative, the eighteen Hùng kings belonged to the Hong Bang dynasty (2879–258 BCE) that ruled over the northern part of Vietnam and southern part of modern China in antiquity. Their progenitors were Lạc Long Quân and his consort Goddess Âu Cơ who produced a sac containing one hundred eggs from which one hundred sons emerged. Dragon Lord Lạc preferred to live by the sea, and Goddess Âu Cơ preferred the snow-capped mountains. The two separated with half of the sons following each parent. The most illustrious of the sons became the first Hùng king who ruled Văn Lang, the realm of all the descendants of Dragon and Goddess Âu Cơ who became the Vietnamese people, from his capital in modern Phú Thọ Province.

=== List of Hùng kings ===
King	Given name	Reign, and line of descent
Kinh Dương Vương (涇陽王)	Lộc Tục (祿續)	2879 BC – 2794 BC, Càn line (支乾)
Lạc Long Quân (貉龍君)	Sùng Lãm (崇纜)	2793 BC – 2525 BC, Khảm line (支坎)
Hùng Lân vương(雄麟王),Hùng King III	Lân Lang	2524 – 2253 BC, Cấn line (支艮)
Hùng Diệp Vương(雄曄王),Hùng King IV	Bửu Lang	2254 – 1913 BC, Chấn line (支震)
Hùng Hy Vương, Hùng King V	Viên Lang	1912 – 1713 BC, Tốn line (支巽)
Hùng Huy Vương(雄暉王), Hùng King VI	Pháp Hải Lang	1712 – 1632 BC, Ly line (支離)
Hùng Chiêu vương(雄昭王), Hùng King VII	Lang Liêu	1631 – 1432 BC,Khôn line(支坤)
Hùng Vĩ vương(雄暐王) Hùng King VIII	Thừa Vân Lang	1431 – 1332 BC,Đoài line (支兌)
Hùng Định vương(雄定王), Hùng King IX	Quân Lang	1331 – 1252 BC,Giáp line (支甲)
Hùng Hi vương(雄曦王), Hùng King X	Hùng Hải Lang	1251 – 1162 BC,Ất line (支乙)
Hùng Trinh Vương(雄楨王), Hùng King XI	Hưng Đức Lang	1161 – 1055 BC,Bính line (支丙)
Hùng Vũ Vương(雄武王), Hùng King XII	Đức Hiền Lang	1054 – 969 BC, Đinh line (支丁)
Hùng Việt Vương(雄越王),Hùng King XIII	Tuấn Lang	968 – 854 BC,Mậu line (支戊)
Hùng Anh Vương(雄英王),Hùng King XIV	Chân Nhân Lang	853 – 755 BC, Kỷ line (支己)
Hùng Triệu Vương(雄朝王), Hùng King XV	Cảnh Chiêu Lang	754 – 661 BC, Canh line (支庚)
Hùng Tạo Vương(雄造王),the Hung King XVI	Đức Quân Lang	660 – 569 BC,Tân line (支辛)
Hùng Nghị Vương(雄毅王), Hung King XVII	Bảo Quân Lang	568 – 409 BC,Nhâm line (支壬)
Hùng Duệ Vương(雄睿王),the Hung King XVIII	Lý Văn Lang or Mai An Tiêm	408 – 258 BC,Qúy line (支癸)

== Earliest references ==
The earliest references to the Hung kings are found in early collections of Records of Nanyue or Nanyuezhi (南越志) in the 978 anthology Extensive Records of the Taiping Era. It said:

Jiaozhi's land was very fertile. After people settled there, they began to cultivate. Its soils are black, its climate gloomy and fierce (慘雄; SV: thảm hùng). So hitherto its fields were called Hùng fields (雄田; SV: Hùng điền) and its people were Hùng people (雄民, SV: Hùng dân). Their leader was Hùng king (雄王; SV: Hùng vương), and his chief advisors were hùng lords (雄侯; SV: Hùng hầu), the lands [were] distributed to Hùng generals (雄將; SV: Hùng tướng).

However, the 4th century Almanacs of the Outer Territories of the Jiao province (交州外域記) mentioned Lạc fields, Lạc people, Lạc generals, and Lạc lords, ruled by Lạc king, instead:

During the time before Jiaozhi had commanderies and prefectures, the soil and land had Lạc fields (雒田; SV: lạc điền). These fields followed the flood's ebbs and flows. The people cultivated these fields for foods, so they were called Lạc people (雒民; SV: Lạc dân). The Lạc King (雒王; SV: Lạc vương) and Lạc Lords (雒侯; SV: Lạc hầu) [were] established to govern all those commanderies and prefectures. [In the] prefectures many [were] made Lạc generals (雒將; SV Lạc tướng). Lạc generals [wore] copper seals and blue-green ribbons.

Therefore, French scholar Henri Maspéro and Vietnamese scholar Nguyễn Văn Tố proposed that 雄 (SV: Hùng) was actually a scribal error for 雒 (SV: Lạc).

The Hùng kings' eighteen generations (or dynasties) were mentioned in Đại Việt sử lược (大越史略 – Great Viet's Abridged History) by an anonymous 14th-century author:

In King Zhuang of Zhou's time, in Gia Ninh division (嘉寧部), there was a strange man, [who] could use mystical arts [to] overwhelm all the tribes; he styled [him]self Đối king (碓王, SV: Đối Vương); [His] capital was in Văn Lang, [his state's] appellation was Văn Lang state (文郎國). Their customs were substantively honest; strings and knots [were used] for their regulations. Passing down eighteen generations, all [were] styled Đối kings.

Chinese historian Luo Xianglin, apud Lai (2013), considered 碓王 (SV: Đối Vương; lit. "Pestle King") to be 雒王 (SV: Lạc Vương) erroneously transmitted.

Another early known reference is purportedly found in a story called "Tale of the Mountain Spirit and Water Spirit' in the 1329 Việt Điện U Linh Tập (Collection of legends and biographies of heroes and founding spirits) compiled by Lý Tế Xuyên, where the Hung King was a mere ruler. The next earliest appearance is in the fourteenth-fifteen century Lĩnh Nam chích quáí (Arrayed Tales of Selected Oddities from South of the Passes), a collection of myths and legends compiled by various authors.

== Early 20th century textual references ==
Textual references in the early 20th century highlight that the Hùng kings were already a key part of the Vietnamese collective memory.

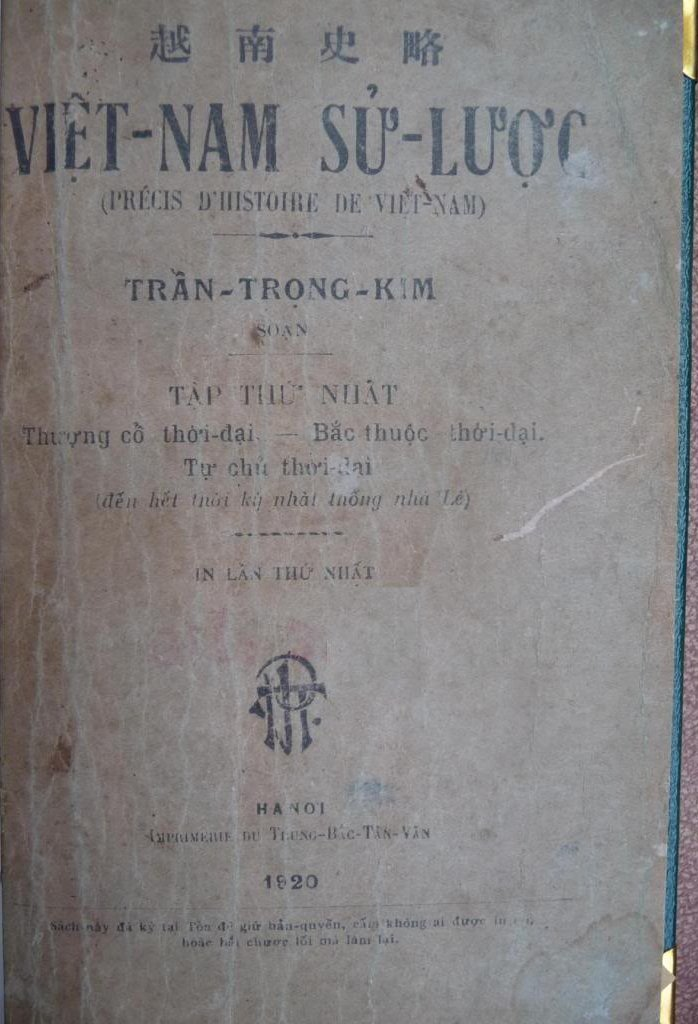
The 1920 version of Trần Trọng Kim's Việt Nam sử lược

- The 1916 Trần Trọng Kim's Elementary Textbook for a Brief History of Annam, the first vernacular history of Vietnam in the Vietnamese alphabet, covered the period from the Hùng kings to colonial times. (Trần Trọng Kim was an official in the education service who later became prime minister of the 1945 Japanese-sponsored Bảo Đại government.) In the book, Trần Trọng Kim uses the expression that has become one of the most popular labels for the Việt connecting them to the Hùng kings – "race of the Dragon and the Fairy", and in his revised 1920 edition, "children of the Fairy, grandchildren of the Dragon" or "the descendants of the Fairy and the Dragon". Trần Trọng Kim's text became a standard textbook until 1954 in all parts of Vietnam.
- Phan Bội Châu, an early Vietnamese nationalist, wrote a poem in 1910 which glorifies the lineage of "children of the Dragon, grandchildren of the Fairy".
- Hồ Chí Minh's biography, published in South Vietnam in 1948, mentions Ho recalling the day of the Proclamation of Independence of Vietnam on September 2, 1945, and describing it as a "day to remember for twenty-five million people, the children of the Lạc and the grandchildren of Hồng".

== Historicity ==
=== Developments in the 15th century ===
Historians studying the Hùng kings have suggested that developments from the 13th to the 15th centuries explain why there was a desire by Đại Việt to incorporate the founding epic of the Hùng kings into its history.

As different groups of local elites in Jiaozhi in the 1000s and worked at the transition to an independent Đại Việt, the question of political legitimisation was an urgent one that needed tackling – especially given the lack of ancient Viet sources to base on, and after about a thousand years of Chinese rule. This explained why it attempted to reach back in time and create a mythic past for itself to serve its present political needs. Although part of the legitimisation process included eliminating colonial (Chinese) influences, ironically, it was this ease with Chinese characters and sources that caused them to utilise Chinese history and sources to validate their own.

Academics have argued that the historicization and utilisation of the Hùng kings epic can be explained by developments from the thirteenth century. Three devastating invasions – by the Mongols in the thirteenth century, the Cham in the fourteenth century, and the Ming in the fifteenth century, corresponded with the myth's emergence and absorption into historiography. By late 1330, with social problems growing in the countryside, the Trần ruler Minh Tông started to move away from Thiền (Zen) Buddhism which did not seem to be working in its integrative function, and looked to Confucianism and antiquity. He brought the Confucian teacher Chu Văn An into the capital, and the latter's emphasis on the classical beliefs of China and its antiquity set the intellectual tone of Thang-long. Antiquity was now seen as providing solutions for the difficult present. The disastrous invasion by the Cham under Chế Bồng Nga destroyed the Trần dynasty, and caused Vietnamese literati to seek desperately for a means to restore harmony. The Ming occupation of 1407–1427 dramatically deepened the influence of the literati through promoting schools and scholarship.

Developments from the thirteenth century then combined to set the stage for the state promotion of the Hùng king founding myth by the 15th century. There was a shift away from a more indigenous, pre-Southeast Asian phase, to the 'Neo-Confucian revolution" of Lê Thánh Tông. This, together with the chaos created by the devastating invasions and internal social problems, encouraged a search for 'Vietnamese Antiquity' modelled on classical Chinese antiquity, in the mythic creation of 'Văn Lang' via the Hùng king.

=== Canonization in Ngô Sĩ Liên's Đại Việt sử ký toàn thư (Complete Book of the Historical Records of Đại Việt) ===
The canonization of the Hùng kings founding myth was carried out by Ngô Sĩ Liên in his compiling of a new history of the realm under the order of Emperor Lê Thánh Tông (1460–97), drawing upon popular sources. This history, the Đại Việt sử ký toàn thư (Complete Book of the Historical Records of Đại Việt), was used by the emperor as a tool to promote Việt 'national feeling'. Thus, Ngô Sĩ Liên was tasked to promote Đại Việt's supernatural and millennial ancestry. This marked the first time a Việt state traced its origins back to the first realm of Văn Lang of the Hùng kings, calculated by Ngô Sĩ Liên to be in 2879 BCE. Prior to this, official dynastic histories of the Việt started with Triệu Đà, acknowledging a Qin general as the founder of the Nam Việt. This was done based mostly on da su (chronicles) and in particular, the Arrayed Tales. Court historians in the later dynasties followed Ngô Sĩ Liên's example in integrating the Hùng kings into Việt official historiography.

=== Dissemination of Hùng kings epic from the 15th century ===
There was likely already a long oral tradition in the Red River Delta of the re-enactment of myths and legends at the level of the village even before myths were written into literature. Each village held yearly festivities at the communal temple with public recitations and re-enactments (diễn xướng) during which villagers recreated a specific myth, historical event, or character. Thus, Hùng kings worship may have existed locally before the 15th century, manifesting in the construction of temples and shrines, and in oral propagation of different variations of the Hùng kings epic.

Emperor Lê Thánh Tông authorised in 1470 the Hùng Vương ngọc phả thập bát thế truyền (Precious genealogy of the eighteen reigns of the Hùng Kings). The text was reproduced in the successive dynasties, and court-issued copies were worshipped in village temples. Spirit promulgation was promoted by imperial decrees and intensified as the dynasties passed. In the 16th and 17th century, court academicians compiled, recopied, and modified collections of myths and genealogies about supernatural beings and national heroes, including that of the Hùng kings. This were then accepted and perpetuated by villages. The Hùng kings were transformed into Thành hoàng (tutelary god) sanctified by imperial orders and by popular feeling stemming from long traditions of ancestor worship.

Over time, the worship of Hùng kings evolved; they acquired sons-in-laws who became Mountain Spirits, when migrating south with the territorial expansion, and transformed themselves into Whale Spirits when near the sea. Land was also provided to temples in Phú Thọ province, the site of the main Hung temple, to meet the expense of Hùng kings worship. As late as 1945, the Nguyễn court continued to delegate officials to oversee rituals in the Hùng kings temples of Phú Thọ. Nguyễn Thị Diệu argues that as the result of the meeting of the two currents, that of the state's mythographic construction and that of popular, village-based animistic worship, the Hùng kings came to be venerated as the ancestral founders of the Việt nation in temples throughout the Red River Delta and beyond.

The dissemination of the Hùng kings myth was also facilitated by the use of the lục bát (six-eight) verse form – tales recounted using this form, aided with the use of Quốc Âm (National Sound) instead of Literary Chinese, and the use of colourful verse close to the vernacular, allowed for the ease of memorisation and transmission of such myths.

=== Hùng kings in South Vietnam/Republic of Vietnam (RVN) ===
The Hùng kings seem to have been well embedded in Vietnamese collective memory by the 1950s in the RVN. Olga Dror has written about how the perception of the Hùng kings as common ancestors of all Vietnamese was mobilised for various agendas despite admitting a lack of historical evidence about them.

Just like in the DRV and SRV, the RVN also commemorated the Hùng kings' in a national holiday. The Hùng kings Memorial Day was one of the twenty official holidays at the inception of the RVN but was dropped in January 1956 from the official list as Ngô Đình Diệm as prime minister decided that citizens would not have time off for the holiday. The Hùng kings was hence rejected at the official level. However, at the public level, commemorations were allowed. The Saigon News Review and the Vietnam News Agency reported on celebrations around the state with the participation of many officials.

With the assassination of Ngô Đình Diệm and changes in the RVN government, the Hùng kings Memorial Day was restored to the list of official holidays in February 1964, allocating a whole day off for government employees and students. The Hùng kings Memorial Day became one of the seven official holidays in the RVN with a full day of rest. In an April 1964 decree, the Hùng kings Memorial Day also became one of the four holidays requiring private businesses to give their employees paid time off. This elevated the status of the Hùng kings and highlighted their importance for official discourse.

Perhaps the most important indication of the Hùng kings Memorial Day's significance is that it was a contender for the honour of being designated as National Day. In 1967, the National Assembly considered whether the Hùng kings Memorial Day should also be made Independence Day. While the initiative failed, the idea was surfaced again in the Senate in 1971 and discussed in the cabinet in 1973.

=== Hùng kings in North Vietnam/Democratic Republic of Vietnam (DRV)'s national history ===
The conversion of the Hùng kings to historical "truth" in the DRV emerged over time through extensive discussions by DRV official scholars and resolutions by the Party such as regarding the establishment of the date of the death anniversary of the Hùng kings and its celebration in festivals. The Institute of Archaeology was established in 1968 with the highest priority given to scientifically documenting the Hùng kings. The Institute launched excavations and organised conferences between 1968 and 1971 to discuss the findings and published their proceedings.

Historian Patricia Pelley posits that the selection of the Hùng Kings and the Hung dynasty during the Văn Lang period was part of Hanoi's quest to create a "cult of antiquity" to illustrate the historical longevity and prestige of Vietnam that predated the Chinese occupation. The transformation of the Hùng kings into historical fact was based on the conflation of different kinds of evidence such as archaeological remains, dynastic chronicles, collections of legends, and a poem attributed to Hồ Chí Minh titled "The History of Vietnam from 2879 BCE to 1945".

DRV scholar and the first president of the Institute of History, Trần Huy Liệu, settled the question of the origins of the Vietnamese nation in an article on the Hùng kings. The article noted that on the "tenth day of the third lunar month, the central government and local government held an official ceremony to commemorate the death anniversary of our Hung king ancestors at the Temple of the Hùng kings." He commented that the Hùng kings were the "origins of the nation" as they "built the country", and "if there had been no Hùng kings, then there would be no Đinh, Lê, Lý, Trần, Hồ, or Nguyễn, and also no Democratic Republic of Vietnam". Trần Huy Liệu also wrote that the "patriotic spirit and indomitable tradition of our nation broke out in the thousand years of Chinese feudal rule, and it broke out in the hundred years under the domination of the French colonizers." He concluded by lamenting that "at this time our lovely country has been provisionally divided into two regions and our fellow countrymen in the South moan and writhe under the fascist regime of the gang of Ngô Đình Diệm, lackey of the American imperialists."

Historian Cherry Haydon notes that this article is important for a few reasons. First, it highlights the direct link made between the period of the Hùng kings and the formation of the Vietnamese nation. Second, it dates the origins of Vietnamese resistance to foreign aggression to the founding of the nation; third, it states explicitly the continuity between the period of the Hùng kings and the present. The dating of the origins of the nation to the rule of the Hùng kings would eventually become the orthodox position of historians at the Research Committee, the Institute of History, and later the Institute of Archaeology.

=== Hùng kings and the Bronze Age ===
Bronze Age relics have been used to support the existence of the kingdom of Van Lang and the Hùng kings. The official DRV national history, Lịch Sử Việt Nam, published in 1971, asserted the connection between the Bronze Age and the Dong Son culture and the period of the Hùng kings.

However, Haydon Cherry has argued that contrary to the assertions of Vietnamese scholars, such relics cannot provide such a support. He notes that the earliest Vietnamese text to describe this kingdom, the Đại Việt sử lược, dates from the thirteenth century, eighteen hundred years after the kingdom it is supposed to describe. The earliest Chinese text, which mentions not the Hung but the Lac kings, dates from the fourth century CE, eight hundred years after the period it discusses. Hence, such texts are not reliable transmissions of any written or oral tradition over eight or eighteen hundred years.

=== Hùng kings as "invented tradition" ===
Analyses of the earliest sources on the Hùng kings have illustrated problems with these sources that have been used as historical evidence of the existence of the Hùng kings. In particular, historians have examined the Lĩnh Nam chích quái liệt truyện (Arrayed Tales of Selected Oddities from South of the Passes), compiled by Trần Thế Pháp under the late-fourteenth-century Trần dynasty, and amended in the fifteenth century under the Lê dynasty by Vũ Quỳnh and Kiều Phú. This source is of great importance in providing core information for Ngo Si Lien's Đại Việt sử ký toàn thư (Complete Book of the Historical Records of Đại Việt) created in 1479, which marked the official transformation of the Hùng kings into the founders of dynasties. The Đại Việt sử ký toàn thư was in turn the core text that DRV historians used as proof of the ancient origins of the Vietnamese people and the Vietnamese nation.

Based on an analysis of an essay called "Biography of the Hồng Bàng Clan" from the Arrayed Tales, historian Liam Kelley posits that the Hùng kings did not exist. Instead, he argues that they were invented in the medieval period when the Sinicised elite in the Red River Delta first constructed a separate identity in relation to China's cultural heritage. Kelley exposes the problems of the "Biography" in a few ways – for example, by showing how it borrowed figures and accounts from ancient Chinese texts and stories, and by highlighting issues with terms such as "Hùng", "Lạc", and "Việt". He does this by examining ancient Chinese historical sources to highlight similar terms and stories as in "Biography", and search for terms and accounts mentioned in "Biography" to corroborate the existence of the latter's information on the Hùng Kings. In doing so he also shows how this practice of drawing upon old texts for material to create a local history was also practiced at that time in parts of the Chinese empire like Sichuan and Guangdong, hence placing the "Biography" in the broader literary trends of the time.

== Cultural significance ==
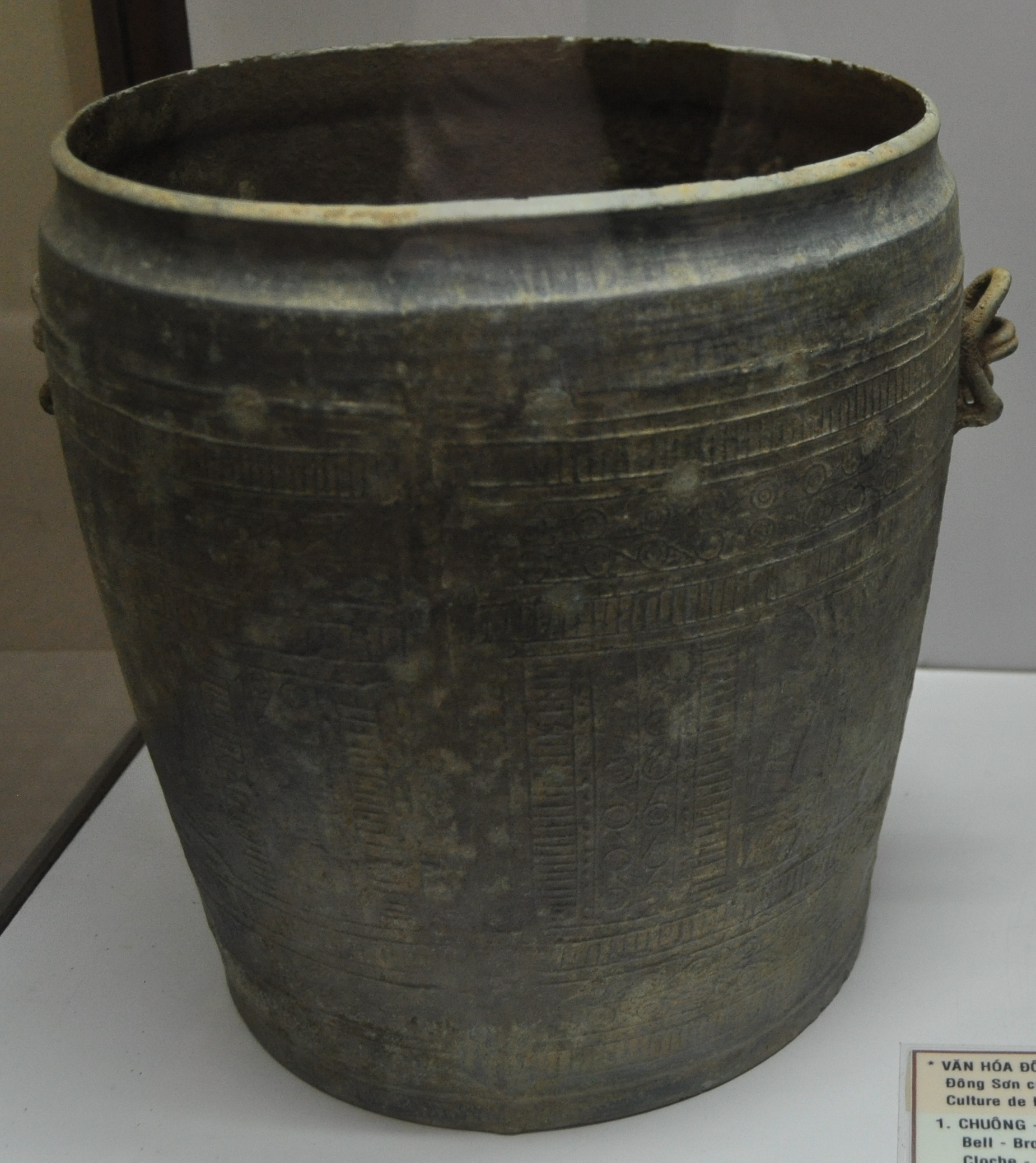
Đông Sơn relic situated in exhibit on Hùng King Period at the Museum of National History

=== National Identity ===
The Hùng kings are perceived as the founders of the Viet civilisation, and are promoted by the government as a source of national pride and solidarity through platforms such as the state-sponsored commemoration of an annual holiday, the Hùng kings Temple Festival, to honour the Hùng kings, and the promotion of the Hung King National Museum in Việt Trì City. In the Museum of Vietnamese History in Ho Chi Minh City, the exhibits are arranged chronologically, with the first one on the "Rise of the Hùng kings".

=== Worship of Hùng kings ===
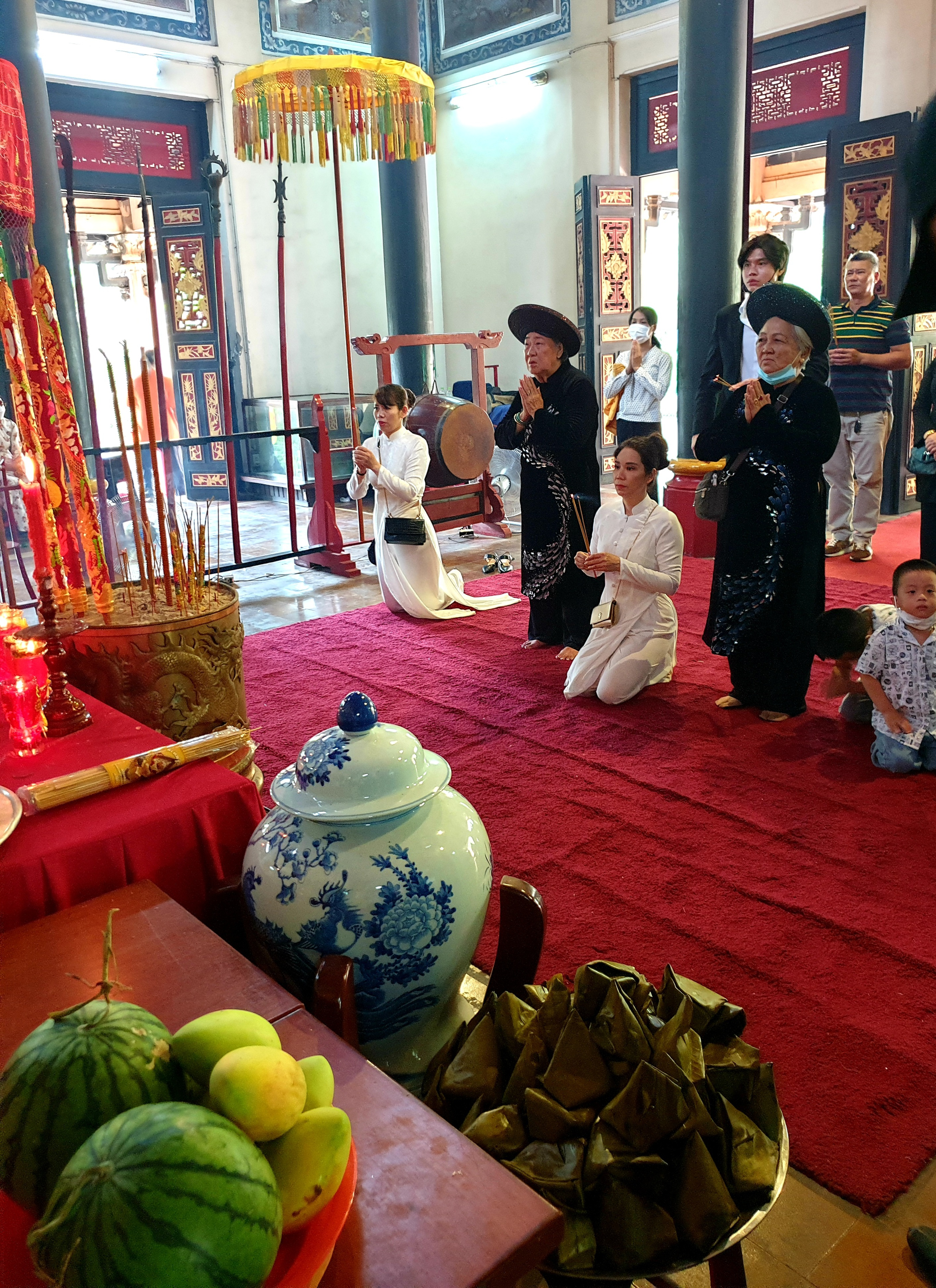
People worship Hùng Kings at Temple of Hùng King on Giỗ Tổ Hùng Vương

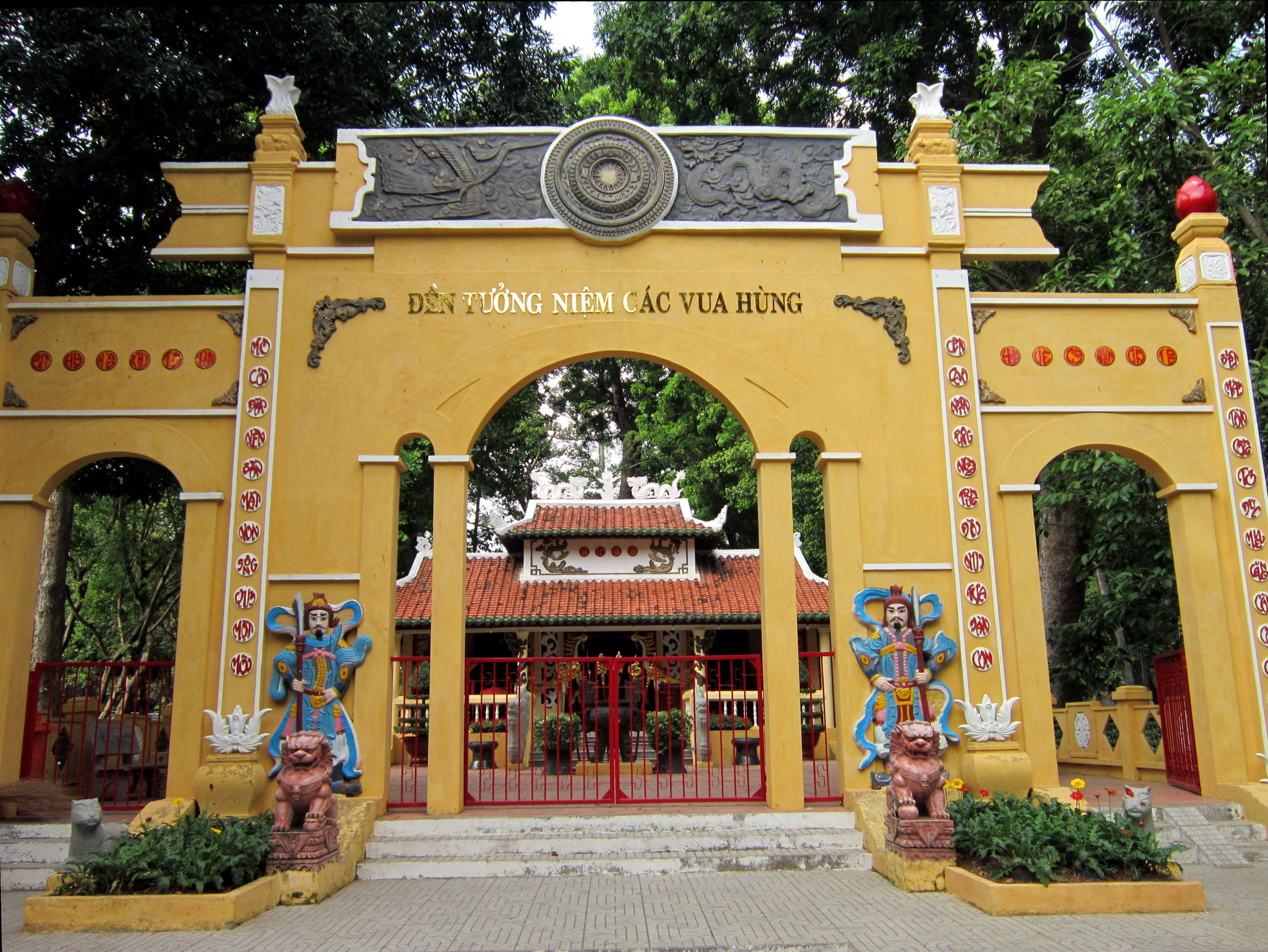
Temple of Hùng Kings at Tao Đàn Park, District 1, Ho Chi Minh City

==== Revival of worship of Hùng kings ====
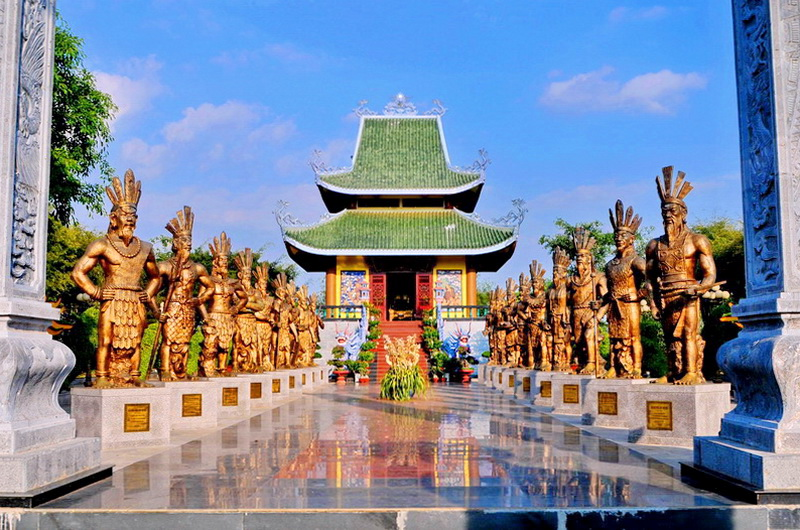
Statues of Hùng Kings at Quốc Tổ Hùng Vương Temple

With the Đổi Mới reforms from 1986, Vietnam saw a resurrection of traditional festivals, including the Hùng kings Temple Festival. Celebrations of the Hùng kings moved from the local to the provincial and then to the state levels. This revival has been perceived as an attempt by the government to maintain the Vietnamese identity of its people in view of increasing foreign influence.

In 1999, the government issued a directive on the celebration on what it perceived as the most important events in 2000. Other than the Hùng kings Festival, the other events perceived to be important were: the seventieth anniversary of the Vietnamese Communist Party, the 110th anniversary of Hồ Chí Minh's birthday, the twenty-fifth anniversary of the victory in the campaign against Americans to save the country, the fifty-fifth anniversary of the August Revolution, and the start of the twenty-first century.

==== Hùng kings Temple Festival ====
The Hùng Kings' Temple Festival (Vietnamese: Giỗ Tổ Hùng Vương or lễ hội đền Hùng) is a Vietnamese festival held annually from the 8th to the 11th days of the third lunar month in honour of the Hùng Kings. The main festival day – which has been designated a public holiday in Vietnam since 2007 – is on the 10th day.

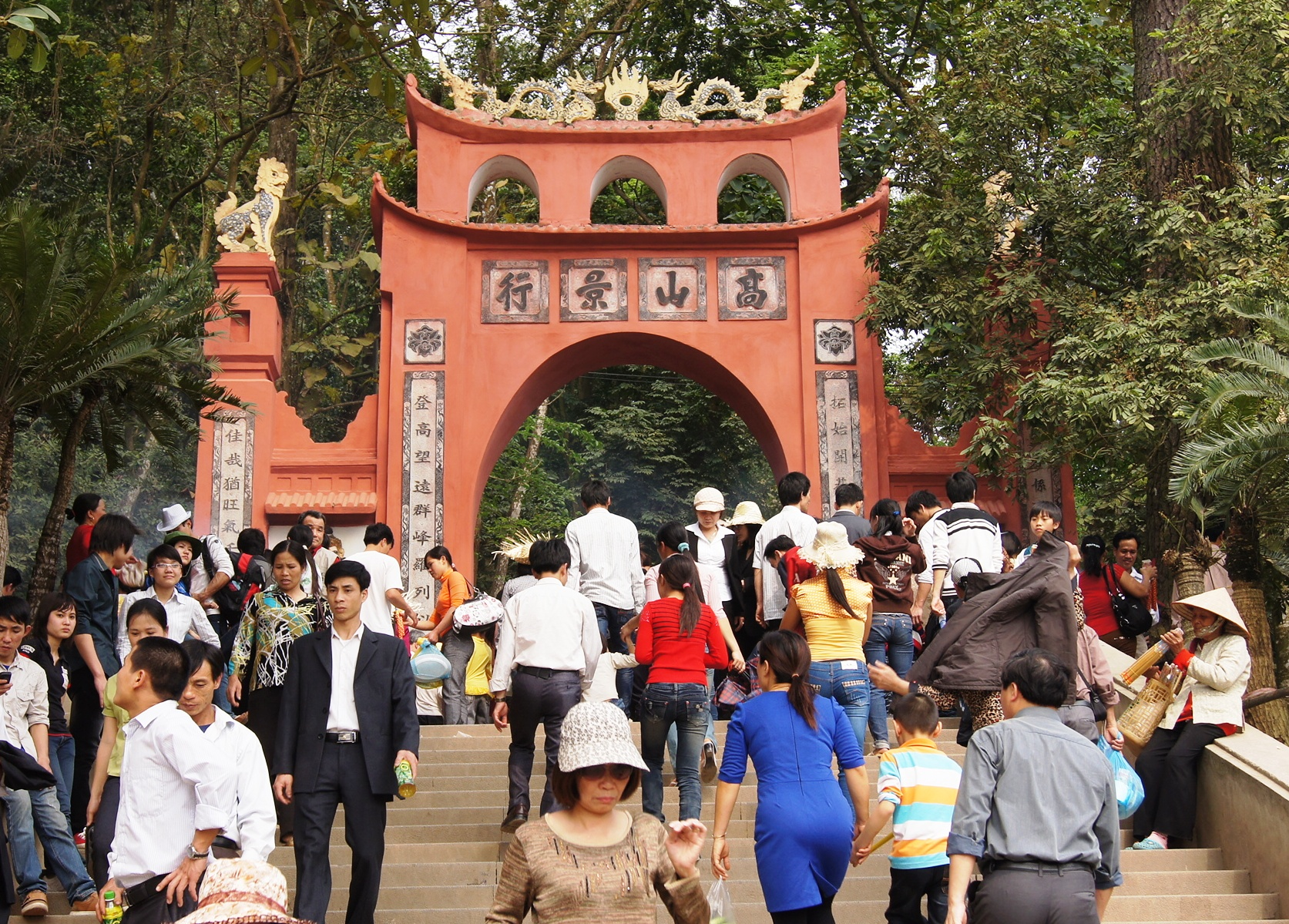
Main Gate of Hùng Temple, Phú Thọ

Every year, leading government figures make pilgrimages to the Hùng kings temple in Phú Thọ province to honour the Quốc tộ (National Founder).

In April 2016, the festival at the Hùng kings temple in Phú Thọ attracted about seven million people. Nguyễn Phú Trọng, the general secretary of the Communist Party, also attended.

In 2018, the state-established Association for Liaison with Overseas Vietnamese (ALOV) implemented a project titled Vietnam Ancestral Global Day which organised various cultural activities worldwide to celebrate Hung Kings Memorial Day. This year is the first time that Vietnam Ancestral Global Day has been celebrated simultaneously in many European countries following a shared format. Since 2015, one of the three main goals of the Vietnam Ancestral Global Day Project has been to preserve and spread the Hùng kings worship rite amongst overseas Vietnamese.

==== UNESCO recognition ====
In 2012, the worship of the Hùng kings in Phú Thọ was recognised by UNESCO as an Intangible Cultural Heritage of Humanity, and the UNESCO page notes that this "tradition embodies spiritual solidarity and provides an occasion to acknowledge national origins and sources of Vietnamese cultural and moral identity".

== See also ==
- Hồng Bàng dynasty
- Hung Kings' Temple Festival

== Sources ==
- Cherry, Haydon, "Digging Up the Past: Prehistory and the Weight of the Present in Vietnam." Journal of Vietnamese Studies, Vol. 4, Issue 1, (2009): 84–144.
- Dror, Olga. "Foundational Myths in the Republic of Vietnam (1955–1975): "Harnessing" the Hùng Kings against Ngô Đình Diệm Communists, Cowboys, and Hippies for Unity, Peace, and Vietnameseness." Journal of Social History, Volume 51, Number 1, Fall 2017, pp. 124–159.
- Goscha, Christopher. Vietnam: A New History. New York: Basic Books, 2016.
- Lieberman, Victor. "John K Whitmore's contribution to Vietnamese and Southeast Asian Studies.", in Aung-Thwin, M. (Ed.), Hall, K. R. (Ed.). (2011). New Perspectives on the History and Historiography of Southeast Asia. London: Routledge.
- Masur, Matthew B. Hearts and Minds: Cultural Nation-Building, 1954–1963. Dissertation, Ohio State University, 2004
- Nguyen, Dieu Thi. "A mythographical journey to modernity: The textual and symbolic transformations of the Hùng Kings founding myths." Journal of Vietnamese Studies, Vol. 7, No. 2 (Summer 2012): 87–130.
- Kelley, Liam C. "The Biography of the Hồng Bàng Clan as a Medieval Vietnamese Invented Tradition." Journal of Vietnamese Studies 7 (2), (2012): 87–130.
- Pelley, Patricia M. Postcolonial Vietnam: New Histories of the National past. Durham, NC: Duke University Press, 2002.
- Resolution of the State Organizational Committee on the commemoration of the big ceremonial days in 2000, no. 01/1999/Q&Dstrok;-BTCNN, December 7, 1999.
- Sterling, Eleanor & Hurley, Martha & Le, Minh. Vietnam: A Natural History. New Haven, Yale University Press, 2006.
- Trần Huy Liệu, "Giỗ tổ hùng vương" [The Commemoration of Our Ancestors the Hùng Kings], VSD 17 (May 1956)
- Whitmore, John K. 'Religion and ritual in the royal courts of Dai Viet', Working Paper 128, Asia
- Research Institute, National University of Singapore, 2009.
- UNESCO, "Worship of Hùng kings in Phú Thọ", UNESCO, Intangible Cultural Heritage, accessed October 2018.
- "Chaos in northern Vietnam as thousands flock to Hung Kings temple", Thanh Nien News, April 16, 2016.
- "Seven million visitors expected to attend Hùng king festival in northern Vietnam," Tuoi tre news, April 16, 2016.
- "Overseas Vietnamese Liaison opens.", Viet Nam News, September 16, 2006.
- "Overseas Vietnamese to celebrate Hung Kings Temple Festival", Vietnam News Agency, April 20, 2018.
