= Gò Mun culture =

The Gò Mun culture (c. 1,100-800 BC) was a culture of Bronze Age northern Vietnam.

The culture is known for pottery, weapons and many jade objects.

== Gallery ==
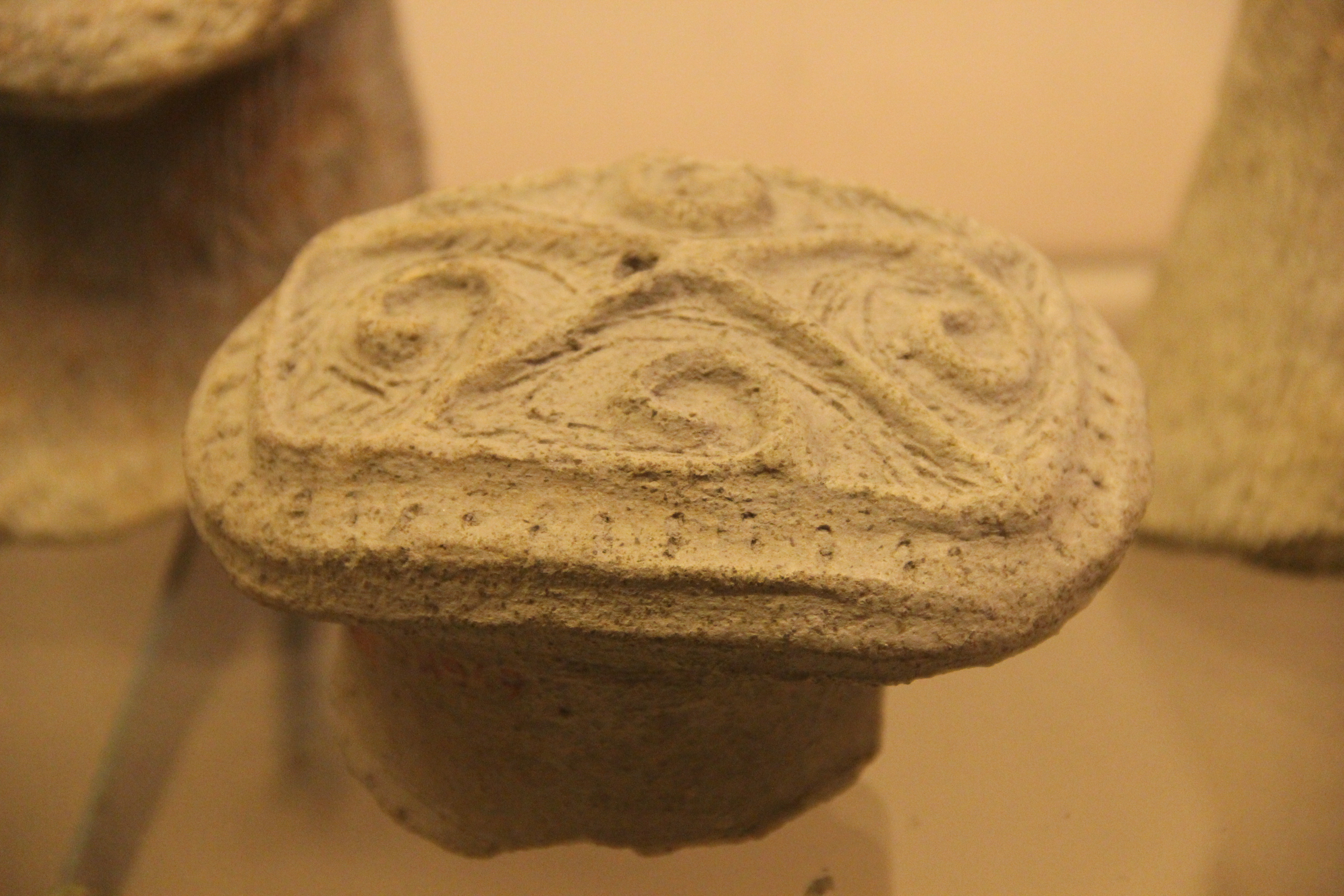
Gò Mun culture pottery fragment

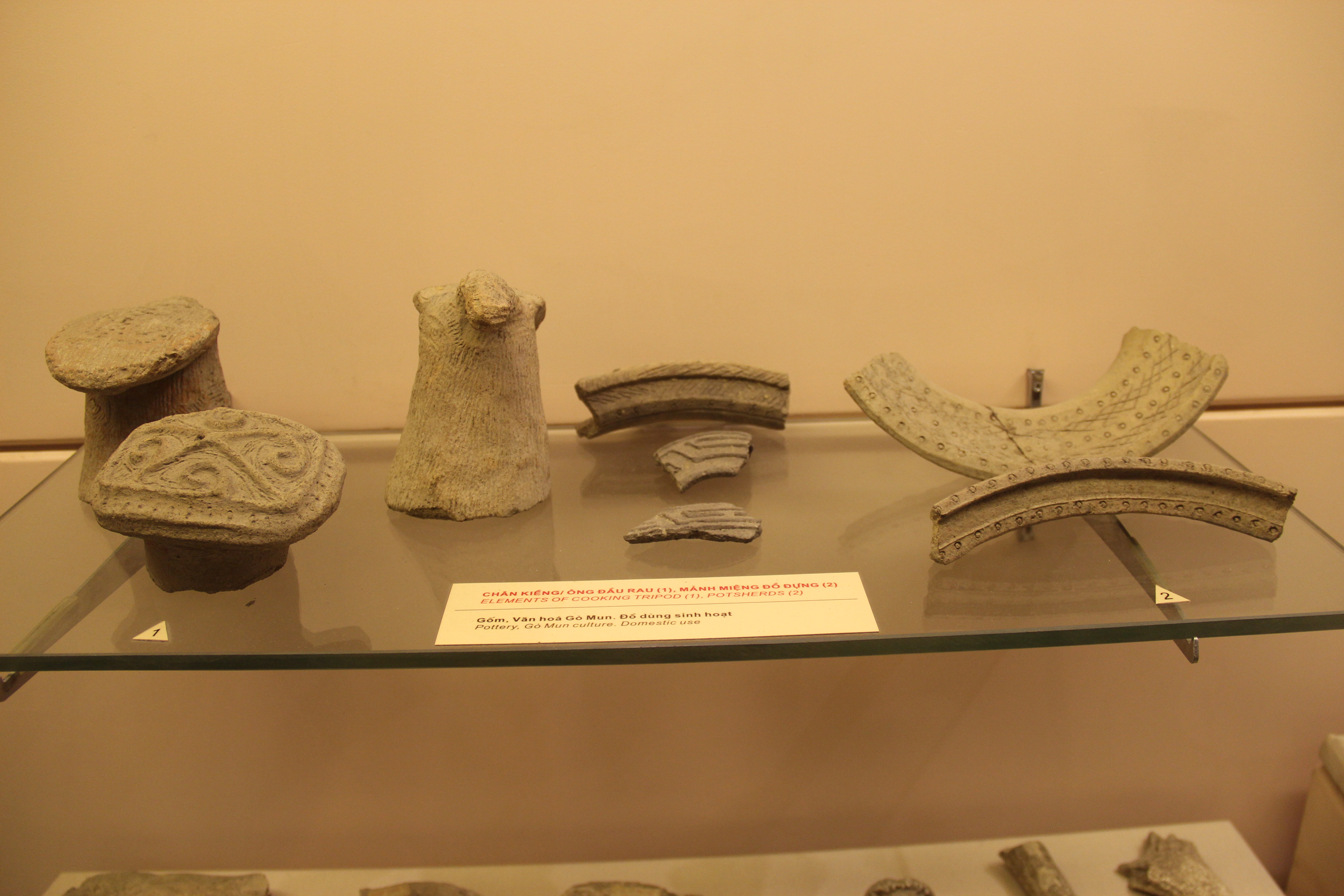
Gò Mun culture pottery fragments

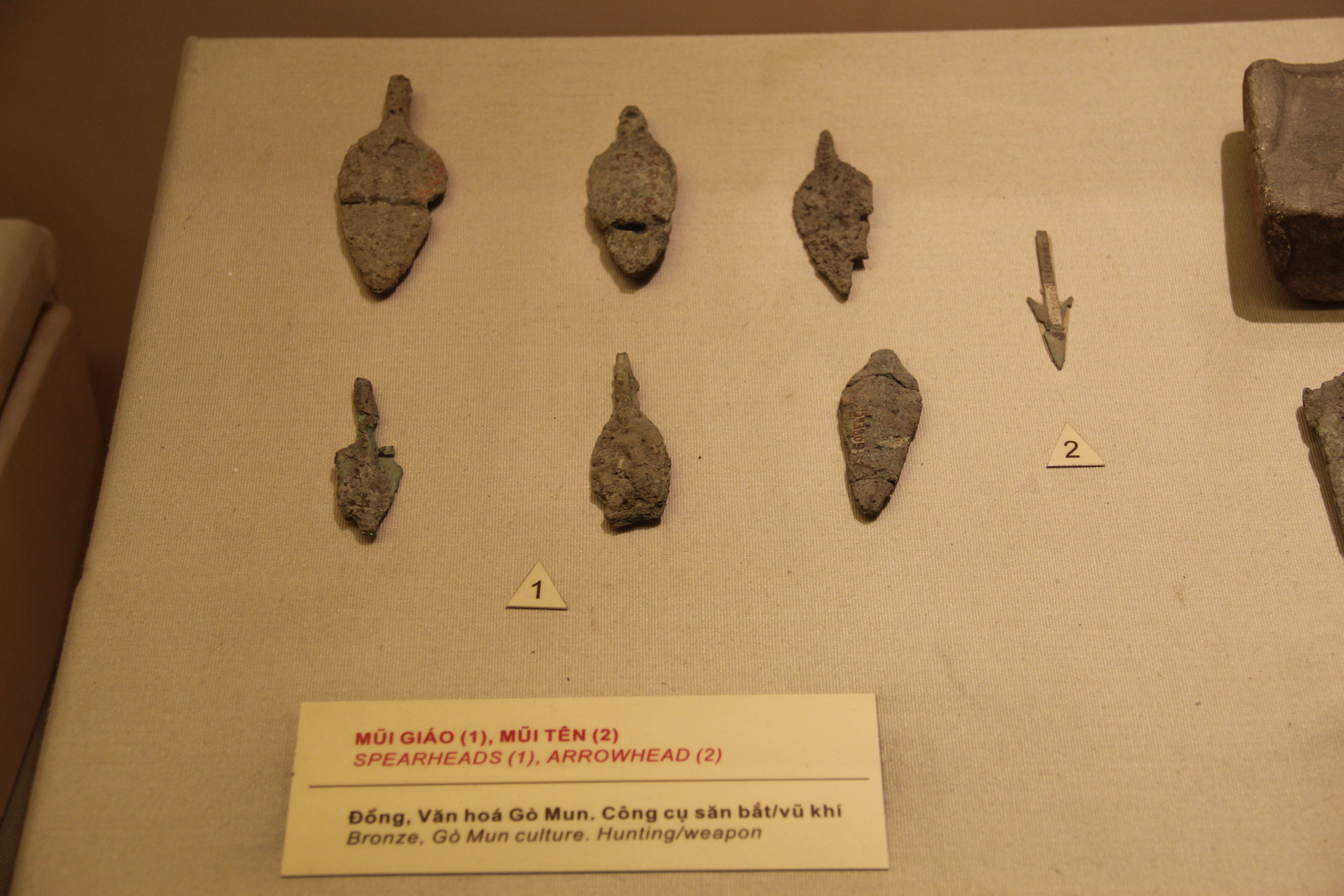
Gò Mun culture bronze spearheads and one arrowhead

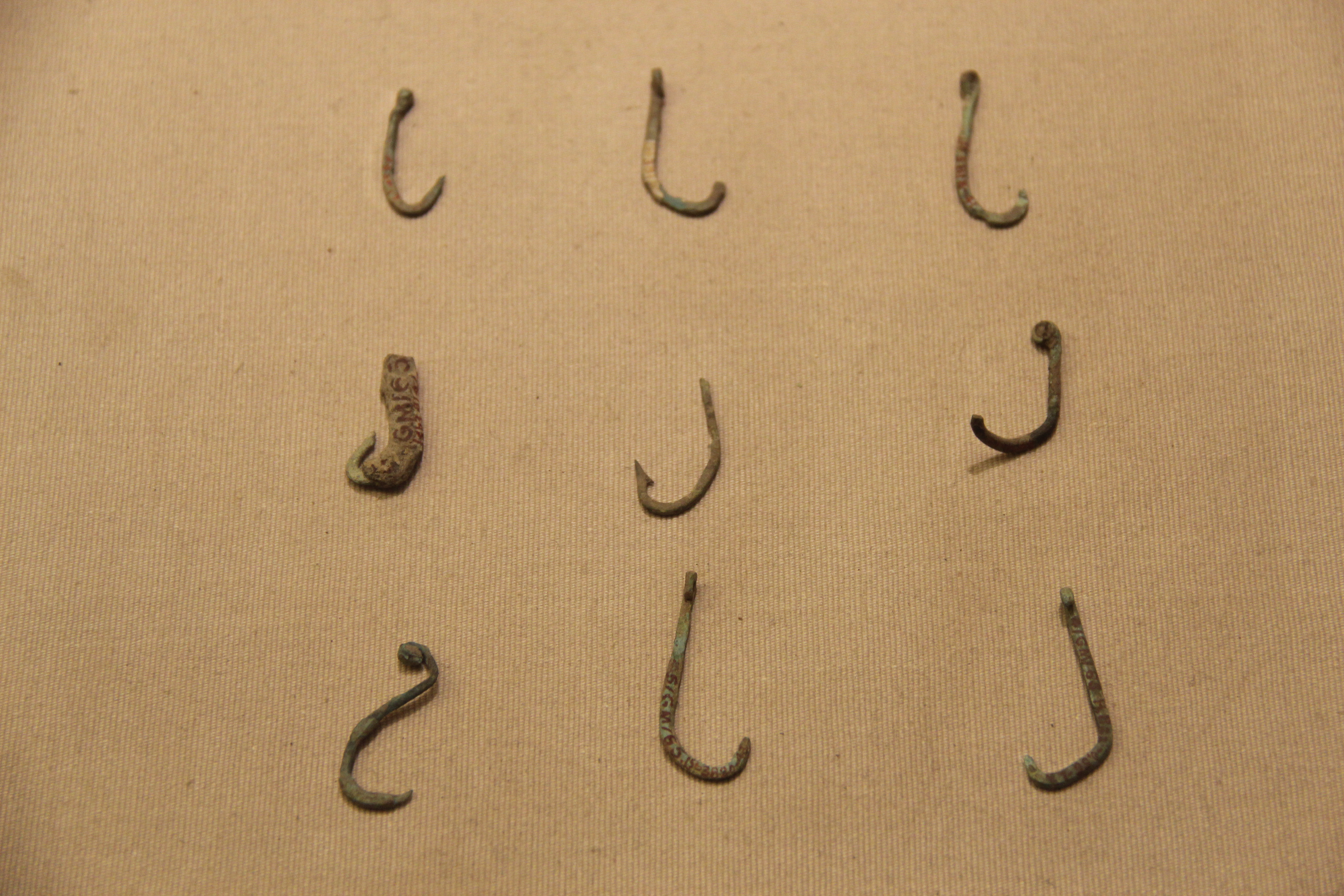
Gò Mun culture bronze fishhooks
