= Phong Châu =

Ancient city in Vietnam

- 峯州 (Vietnamese)
- Location within Vietnam
- 21°16′54″N 105°26′31″E
- Type: Settlement
- Periods: Third dynasty to Eighteenth dynasty of Hùng kings
- Location: Bạch Hạc District, Việt Trì, Phú Thọ Province, Vietnam
- Region: Northern Vietnam

History
- Built by: Unknown, was already in existence during the third dynasty of Hùng kings
- Abandoned: 3rd century BC

Phong Châu (峯州) was the capital city of Văn Lang (now Vietnam) for the most part of the Hồng Bàng period, from the Third dynasty to the eighteenth dynasty of Hùng kings.

== History ==
The historical site was the third capital of Văn Lang, following the previous capital Nghĩa Lĩnh. Its ruins are located near Bạch Hạc District, Việt Trì, Phú Thọ Province, and also the name of Phong Châu district, Phú Thọ province.

Chinese sources, dated back to the Tang dynasty (7th- to 9th-century), were the earliest historical sources which mention Phong Châu as the capital of the ancient state of Văn Lang. (Note: However, Chinese records also state that another people, who lived elsewhere, were also called Văn Lang.)

The 15th century book Đại Việt sử ký toàn thư (Đại Việt Complete History) gave more information about Phong Châu. According to legend, the site was where Âu Cơ, wife of King Lạc Long Quân, gave birth to their children, commemorated at the Hùng Temple in modern Phong Châu district, Phú Thọ province. For this reason, the history of Phú Thọ province is closely linked to that of the country itself. Phong Châu's eventual downfall was due to the weakening of the Hùng king, following the rise of foreign powers. In 258 BC, the Âu Việt tribes under the leadership of Thục Phán sacked Phong Châu during their invasion of Văn Lang. With the end of the Hùng King Epoch, the seat of government moved to Cổ Loa.

== Notable people ==
- Kiều Công Tiễn
- Kiều Công Hãn (vi), a warlord who held Phong Châu, Bạch Hạc, Phu Tho Province, during the Anarchy of the 12 Warlords.

== See also ==
- List of historical capitals of Vietnam

== Note ==
Preceded by Nghĩa Lĩnh	Capital of Vietnam; 26th or 20th century BC – 258 BC	Succeeded by Cổ Loa
