= Hùng Duệ Vương =

- Hùng Vương XVIII

Hùng Vương of Văn Lang
- Reign: 408–258 BC
- Predecessor: Hùng Vương XVII
- Successor: Dynasty Collapsed; Conquered by Thục Phán
- Died: 257 BC; Văn Lang
- Issue: Chử Đồng Tử (son-in-law); Sơn Tinh (son-in-law)
- Father: Hùng Vương XVII

Hùng Duệ Vương was the regnal name of kings in the eighteenth and the last Hùng king, ruling from 408 BC to 258 BC.

== Early life ==
Hùng Vương XVIII's birth date is unknown and he was Hùng Nghị Vương's son.

== Two sons-in-law ==
According to legend, Hùng Vương XVIII had at least three daughters, named Mỵ Nương Tiên Dung, Mỵ Nương Ngọc Hoa and Mỵ Nương Ngọc Nương. The eldest, Tiên Dung, refused to get married upon reaching the age of consent. One day, a dragon boat came to visit the Chử Xá, where a boy named Chử Đồng Tử was fishing out in the fields. After listening to the bell drums and flutes and seeing the crowd, Chử panicked, quickly burying himself in the sand to evade. When the boat landed, Tiên Dung sent people to walk in the bushes to build a shower tent, right on the spot of the buried Chử Đồng Tử. Flushing water gradually exposed Chử Đồng Tử's body in the sand. Tiên Dung was amazed, inquiring about his situation, and then after thinking, asked him for marriage.

After hearing about the news, Hùng Vương was incredibly angry, forbidding Tiên Dung from returning to the palace. The couple opened Hà Thám market, trading with the folks. During a trade, Chử Đồng Tử went far and met a hermit named Phật Quang (Buddha Light), where he stayed, learning magic with him. The Buddha Light presented Chử Đồng Tử a stick and a hat, stating that they were magical items. Chử Đồng Tử and Tiên Dung then left the trading business to travel in search of spiritual teachers. One dark night, tired but finding no inns along the roads, the couple stopped sticks plugged top hat upside break. Suddenly at midnight, the place insurgent citadel, palaces and affluence, most people strewn with soldiers. The next morning, the people staggering around he offered incense sweet fruit to please as servants. From that place that prosperity, affluence as a separate country. Hearing the news, King Hung is meant to create contrast, soldiers rushed out to fight. By midnight suddenly emerged to wind storms, fortresses, palaces and servants of Tien Dung-Chu Dong Tu moment into the sky. Property old ground suddenly collapses into a huge dress, dress Most people called Da Trach (Đầm Một Đêm).

The second toast to the age when access Yuhua Statistics, King Hung Assembly was opened cocoon-law. There are two Gods Son Tinh, God of the Mountains, and Thuy Tinh, God of the Sea, to cocoon-law, are brought in his extraordinary strength. King Hung very awkward about the daughter should do, should he decide who to offer gifts to the earliest they will be married Nuong. Wedding presents included a hundred games of sticky rice, glutinous two hundred banh chung, elephants with nine tusks, chickens with nine spurs, horses with nine feathers, each a double. Those are items of the land, so the sea could not meet the king's requirements. Thus, only Son Tinh could afford to find enough offerings. When Son Tinh became the son in law of King Hung, Thuy Tinh was so furious, he sent his soldiers to fight Son Tinh. A big fight occurred between them. Thuy Tinh could not defeat Son Tinh and had to retreat. However, Thuy Tinh could not give up the idea of taking Nuong back for himself. So, every year Thuy Tinh raises the water and gathers storms up to the mountain top where Son Tinh and Nuong are living. However, he never wins the war. Every year, when the war breaks out, people and animals suffer, crops and properties are destroyed.

== Văn Lang - Âu Lạc War ==
In the third century BC, Âu Việt tribes in the mountains of northern Vietnam and southern Guangxi (about 9 tribes) began to form its own state of the Âu Việt headed by Thục Chế, based in Nanping (now the provinces of Cao Bang). After Thục Chế died, Thuc Phan was conducted to destroy the leader of 9 tribes and gradually expand towards the territory of the Lac Van Lang Vietnamese. According to legend, by Hung Vuong XVIII daughter refused to Thuc Phan should raise military forces of King Hung, use called Hùng-Thục War. Hung Vuong throne to his son-in-law, Nguyen Tuan (or Nguyen Tung, the theory consistent with Son Tinh) against Shu. Along with two generals Nguyen Tuan Cao Minh Son, and you prevent many attacks by Thuc Phan, stop at the frontier troops Nam Thuc Son.

== Loss of independence ==
At the end of the Hong Bang era, the Qin began expanding to the south, invading the lands of the Bách Việt clans. Among these clans were the Lạc Việt, led by the Hùng kings, and the Âu Việt, led by Thục Phán. The clans became allies in the war against the Qin and, after 10 years, emerged victorious. According to one popular theory, the last Hùng king abdicated in favor of Thục Phán, who had the greatest merit in the war. The two clans unified creating the state of Âu Lạc and Thục Phán changed his regnal name to An Dương Vương. The legend goes that Thục Phán so appreciated the transfer of power that he vowed the state would continue to worship the Hùng kings, ordering workers to erect a stone monument in the mountains.

According to a different theory, Thục Phán invaded Văn Lang and the last Hùng king committed suicide upon defeat.
