= 257 BC =

257 BC in various calendars
Gregorian calendar	257 BC; CCLVII BC
Ab urbe condita	497
Ancient Egypt era	XXXIII dynasty, 67
Pharaoh	Ptolemy II Philadelphus, 27
Ancient Greek Olympiad (summer)	130th Olympiad, year 4
Assyrian calendar	4494
Balinese saka calendar	N/A
Bengali calendar	−850 – −849
Berber calendar	694
Buddhist calendar	288
Burmese calendar	−894
Byzantine calendar	5252–5253
Chinese calendar	癸卯年 (Water Rabbit); 2441 or 2234 — to — 甲辰年 (Wood Dragon); 2442 or 2235
Coptic calendar	−540 – −539
Discordian calendar	910
Ethiopian calendar	−264 – −263
Hebrew calendar	3504–3505
- Hindu calendars
Vikram Samvat	−200 – −199
Shaka Samvat	N/A
Kali Yuga	2844–2845
Holocene calendar	9744
Iranian calendar	878 BP – 877 BP
Islamic calendar	905 BH – 904 BH
Javanese calendar	N/A
Julian calendar	N/A
Korean calendar	2077
Minguo calendar	2168 before ROC 民前2168年
Nanakshahi calendar	−1724
Seleucid era	55/56 AG
Thai solar calendar	286–287
Tibetan calendar	阴水兔年 (female Water-Rabbit) −130 or −511 or −1283 — to — 阳木龙年 (male Wood-Dragon) −129 or −510 or −1282

Year 257 BC was a year of the pre-Julian Roman calendar. At the time it was known as the Year of the Consulship of Regulus and Blasio (or, less frequently, year 497 Ab urbe condita). The denomination 257 BC for this year has been used since the early medieval period, when the Anno Domini calendar era became the prevalent method in Europe for naming years.

== Events ==
=== By place ===
==== Roman Republic ====
- The Romans attack Sardinia and try to capture it from the Carthaginians.
- The Battle of Tyndaris is fought between the Roman fleet (with Gaius Atilius Regulus in command) and the Carthaginian fleet off Tyndaris (modern Tindari) in Sicily. Hiero II, tyrant of Syracuse, has allowed Tyndaris to be a base for the Carthaginians. However, after this battle, the town falls to Roman forces.

==== China ====
- The Qin siege of Handan, the capital of the State of Zhao:

- The State of Chu and the State of Wei send armies to assist Zhao against the Qin, and they defeat the Qin army of Wang He outside Handan. This forces Wang He to lift the siege.
- The Qin general Bai Qi is executed for his refusal to take command of the siege.

==== Vietnam ====
- Thục Phán (An Dương Vương), Chief of the Thục Tribe of the Âu Việts, defeats the Văn Lang Confederacy and unifies all Âu Việt and Lạc Việt tribes, thus founding the Kingdom of Âu Lạc and the Thục dynasty.

== Births ==
- Aristophanes of Byzantium, Greek scholar and grammarian (approximate date)

== Deaths ==
- Bai Qi, Chinese general of the Qin State (Warring States Period)
