= An Dương Vương =

King of Âu Lạc from 257 BC to 179 BC

An Dương Vương 安陽王
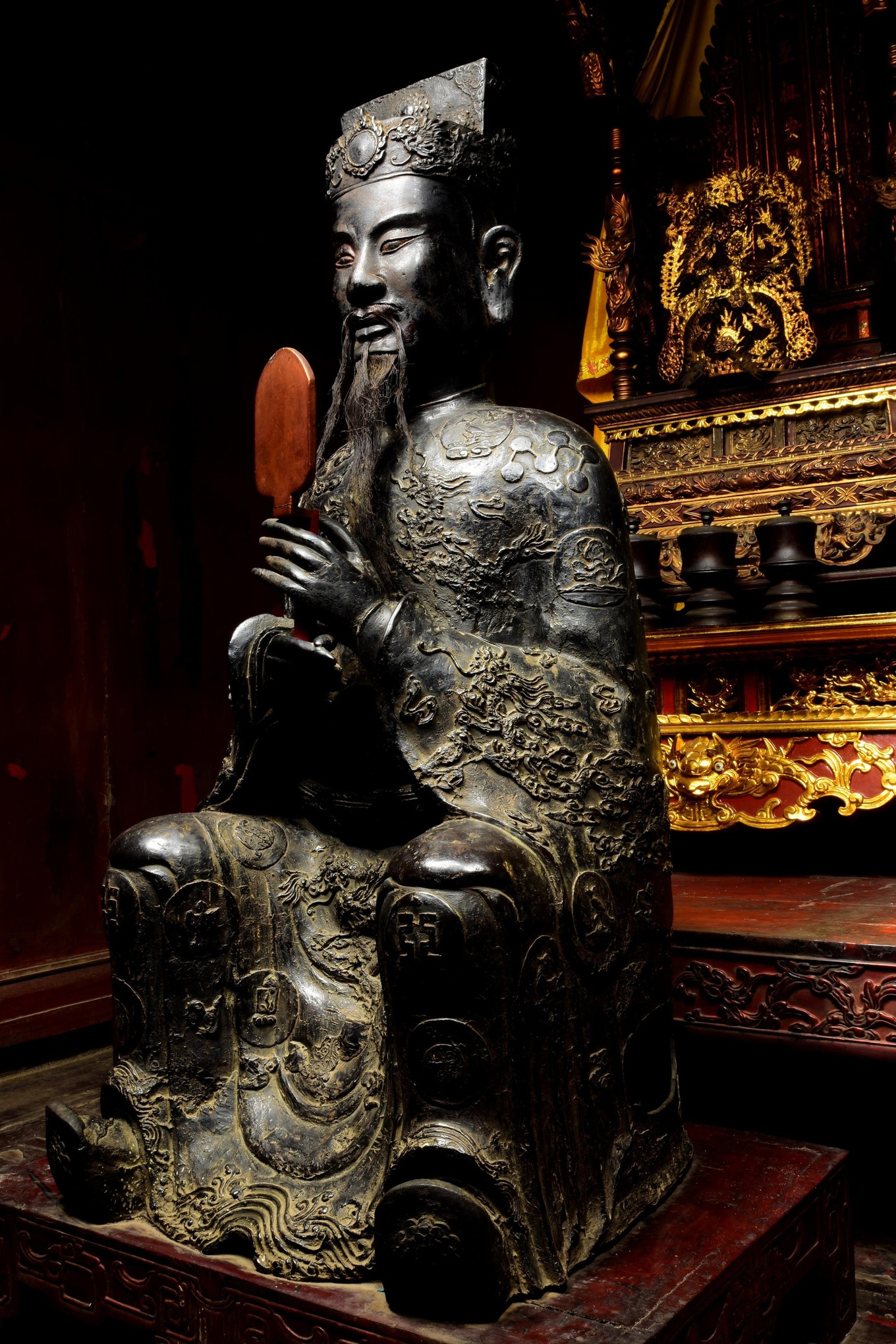
- King An Dương Vương statue at Cổ Loa Temple, Đông Anh, Hanoi

King of Âu Lạc
- Reign: 257–179 BC
- Predecessor: Hùng Duệ Vương of Văn Lang
- Successor: Dynasty collapsed Triệu Vũ Đế of Nanyue
- Born: (possibly 300 BC); Shu (Thục) (Legend)
- Died: about 179 BC (aged c. 121)
- Issue: Mỵ Châu
Names
- Thục Phán (蜀泮)
- Father: Thục Chế 蜀制 (in Tày people's legend)

- An Dương Vương
- Vietnamese alphabet: An Dương Vương
- Chữ Hán: 安陽王

- Birth name
- Vietnamese alphabet: Thục Phán
- Chữ Hán: 蜀泮

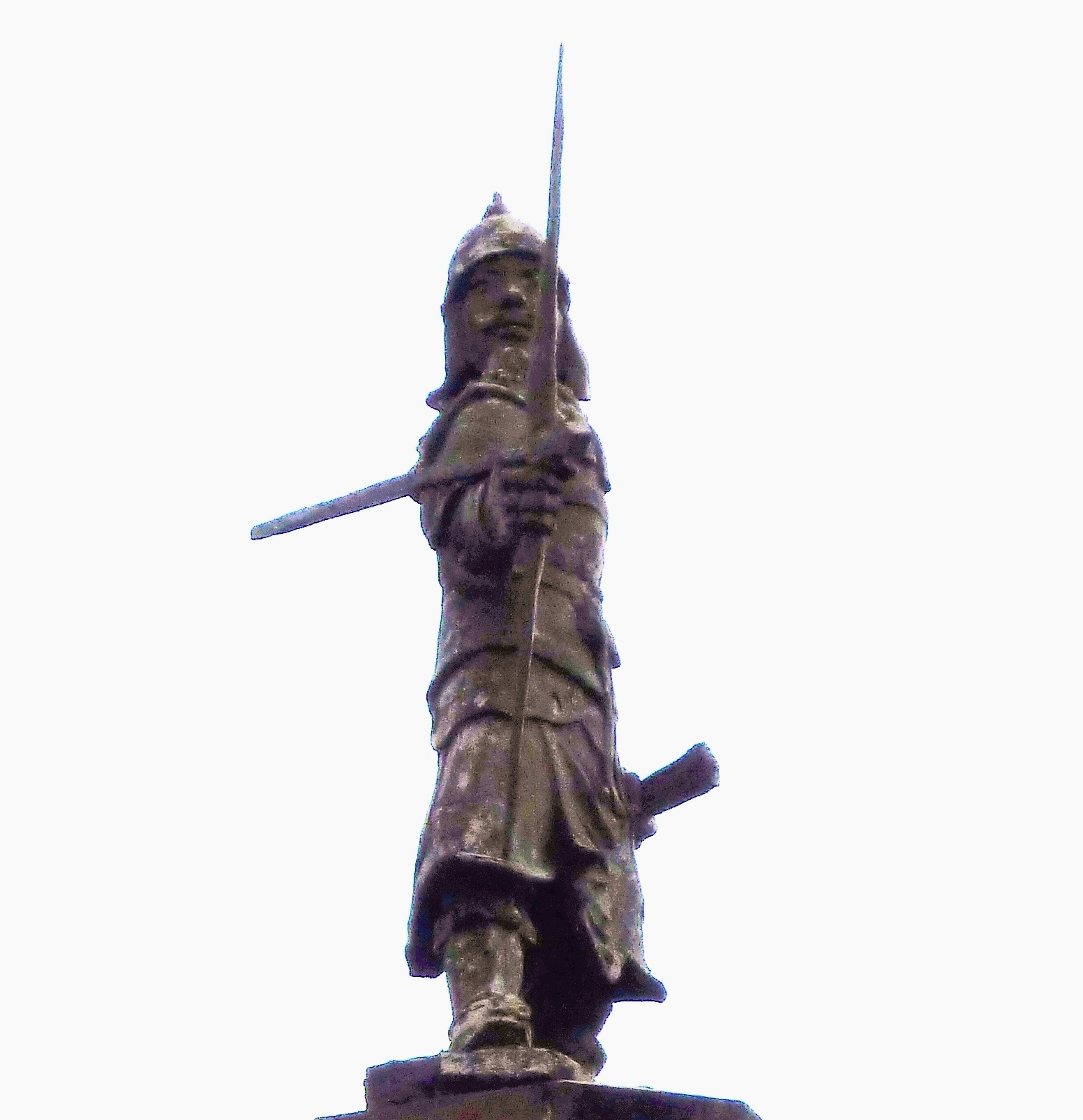
Statue of An Dương Vương in Ho Chi Minh City, Vietnam

An Dương Vương (chữ Hán: 安陽王, Vietnamese: [ʔaːn zɨəŋ vɨəŋ]), personal name Thục Phán, was the founding king and the only ruler of the kingdom of Âu Lạc, an ancient state centered in the Red River Delta. As the leader of the Âu Việt tribes, he defeated the last Hùng king of the state of Văn Lang and united its people – known as the Lạc Việt – with his people, the Âu Việt. An Dương Vương fled and committed suicide after the war with Nanyue forces in 179 BCE.

== Biography ==
=== Origin and foundation of Âu Lạc ===
==== Shu kingdom ====
According to traditional Vietnamese histories, An Dương Vương came from the Kingdom of Shu (in modern Sichuan), which was conquered by King Huiwen of Qin in 316 BCE. Many chronicles including Records of the Outer Territories of the Jiao province, the Đại Việt sử lược, and Đại Việt sử ký toàn thư state that he was a Shu prince (ms. "蜀王子", literal meaning: "son of the Shu king") or the king of Shu. Some historians doubt the authenticity of this origin. The kingdom of Shu was conquered by the Qin in 316 BCE, making An Dương Vương's position as either king or prince of Shu chronologically tenuous. However the connection between Proto-Vietnam and a region to their northwest may have some merit. There is solid archaeological evidence linking the culture of Yunnan in southwest China to the Proto-Vietnamese. According to Stephen O'Harrow, the exact origin of An Dương Vương might not have been Shu but somewhere else even further away. Due to the gap in time between the origin of the story and when it was recorded, the location could have been changed out of contemporary considerations, or simply mistaken due to an error in geographical knowledge. In the Khâm định Việt sử Thông giám cương mục, the writers expressed doubts about An Dương Vương's origin, claiming it was impossible for a Shu prince to cross thousands of miles, through forests, and many kingdoms to invade Văn Lang. However in the 1950s, historians Trần Văn Giáp and Đào Duy Anh argued that An Dương Vương's Shu origin was in fact true.

Cuong T. Mai's 2022 research analyzes how the story of An Dương Vương was transformed in the 15th century for political and moral purposes within Đại Việt, and its relationship to the similar story of King Trieu Viet.

==== Tày folklore ====
In 1963, an oral tradition of Tày people in Cao Bằng titled Cẩu chủa cheng vùa "Nine Lords Vying for Kingship" was recorded. According to this account, at the end of Hồng Bàng dynasty, there was a kingdom called Nam Cương (lit. "southern border") in modern-day Cao Bằng and Guangxi. This was a confederation of 10 mườngs, in which the King resided in the central one (present-day Cao Bằng Province). The other nine regions were under the control of nine lords. When King An Dương's father (Thục Chế 蜀制) died, he was still a child; yet, his intelligence enabled him to retain the throne and all the lords surrendered. Nam Cương became more and more powerful while Văn Lang became weak. Subsequently, he invaded Văn Lang and founded the state of Âu Lạc in approximately 257 BCE, proclaiming himself King An Dương (An Dương Vương).

The story of An Dương Vương's origin in Nam Cương is considered suspect by some historians. The story was published in 1963 as a translation of a Tày story by Lã Văn Lô. In 1969 the Institute of Archaeology attempted to find the origin of this story in Cao Bằng but failed to identify any archaeological evidence for the tale. The investigation did find that the story was originally written down by Lê Đình Sự. Lê Đình Sự was Tày and collected various Tày stories and recorded them in prose. This was supposedly what Lã Văn Lô translated into Vietnamese but the investigation could not confirm whether or not this was true since the person who owned Lã Văn Lô's text had died. As such, some historians doubt the story's validity as a historical document. There is no extant copy of the original Tày version of the story. The title in Tày is Cẩu chủa chenh vùa but with the exception of "Cẩu"("nine" in Tai languages), the rest of the words are simply Vietnamese words with different tones or a minor difference in spelling.

=== Construction of Cổ Loa Citadel ===
Historical accounts claim, after purportedly taking power, King An Dương ordered to construct a fortified settlement in Tây Vu known to history as Cổ Loa as his seat of power. It looked like a snail shell design (its name, Cổ Loa 古螺, means "old snail": according to Đại Việt Sử Ký Toàn Thư, the citadel is shaped like a snail (Note: ĐVSKTT (Peripheral Records/Volume 1:6a): "王於是築城于越裳，廣千丈，盤旋如螺形，故號螺城。" "The King then built a citadel at Việt Thường, one-thousand-zhàng wide, whirling and swirling like the shape of a snail. Therefore, it was called Old Snail City (Loa Thành).")).

The events associated with the construction of this spiral-shaped citadel are remembered in the legend of the golden turtle. According to this legend, when the citadel was being built, all the work done was mysteriously undone by a group of spirits led by thousand-year-old white chicken seeking to avenge the son of the previous king. In response to the king's plea, a giant golden turtle suddenly emerged from the water, and protected the King until the citadel's completion. The turtle gave the King one of his claws before leaving and instructed him to make a crossbow using it as a trigger, assuring him he would be invincible with it. (Note: ĐVSKTT (Peripheral Records/Volume 1:6b-7b)") A man called Cao Lỗ (or Cao Thông) was tasked to create that crossbow. It was then called "Saintly Crossbow of the Supernaturally Luminous Golden Claw" (靈光金爪神弩; SV: Linh Quang Kim Trảo Thần Nỏ); one shot could kill 300 men. (Note: ĐVSKTT (Peripheral Records/Volume 1:6b-7b)")

=== War with Nanyue ===
In 204 BCE, in Panyu (now Guangzhou), Zhao Tuo established the kingdom of Nanyue. Taylor (1983) believed that when Nanyue and Âu Lạc co-existed, Âu Lạc temporarily acknowledged Nanyue to show their mutual anti-Han sentiment, and this did not imply that Nanyue exerted any real authority over Âu Lạc. Nanyue's influence over Âu Lạc waned after relationship with Han dynasty become normal. The army Zhao Tuo had created to oppose the Han was now available to deploy against the Âu Lạc.

Details of the campaign are not authentically recorded. Zhao Tuo's early setbacks and eventual victory against King An Dương were mentioned in Record of the Outer Territory of Jiao Region (交州外域記) and Records of the Taikang Era of the Jin (晉太康記). (Note: These works no longer remain today, but passages from them are preserved in a 6th century text, Li Daoyuan's Commentary on the Water Classic) (Note: Both were quoted in SJZ (Volume 37): "《交州外域記》曰：交趾昔未有郡縣之時，土地有雒田，其田從潮水上下，民墾食其田，因名爲雒民，設雒王、雒侯，主諸郡縣。縣多爲雒將，雒將銅印青綬。後蜀王子將兵三萬來討雒王、雒侯，服諸雒將，蜀王子因稱爲安陽王。後南越王尉佗舉衆攻安陽王，安陽王有神人名臯通，下輔佐，爲安陽王治神弩一張，一發殺三百人，南越王知不可戰，卻軍住武寧縣。按《晉太康記》，縣屬交趾。越遣太子名始，降服安陽王，稱臣事之。安陽王不知通神人，遇之無道，通便去，語王曰：能持此弩王天下，不能持此弩者亡天下。通去，安陽王有女名曰媚珠，見始端正，珠與始交通，始問珠，令取父弩視之，始見弩，便盜以鋸截弩訖，便逃歸報南越王。南越進兵攻之，安陽王發弩，弩折遂敗。安陽王下船逕出於海，今平道縣後王宮城見有故處。") Records of the Grand Historian mentioned neither King An Duong nor Zhao Tuo's military conquest of Âu Lạc only that after Empress Lü's death (180 BCE), Zhao Tuo used his troops to menace and his wealth to bribe the Minyue, the Western Ou, and the Luo into submission. (Note: Shiji (Volume 113): "佗因此以兵威邊，財物賂遺閩越、西甌、駱，役屬焉，東西萬餘里。" Watson (1961, p. 241):"He sent gifts and bribes to the chiefs of Min-yüeh, Western Ou, and Lo-lo, persuading them to submit to his authority, until the region under his control extended over ten thousand li from east to west.") However, the campaign inspired a legend whose theme is the transfer of the turtle claw-triggered crossbow from King An Duong to Zhao Tuo. According to the myth, ownership of the crossbow conferred political power: "He who is able to hold this crossbow rules the realm; he who is not able to hold this crossbow will perish."

Unsuccessful on the battlefield, Zhao Tuo asked for a truce and sent his son Zhong Shi to submit to King An Dương and serve him. There, he and King An Duong's daughter, Mỵ Châu, fell in love and were married. A vestige of the matrilocal organization required the husband to live in the residence of his wife's family. As a result, they resided at An Duong's court until Zhong Shi discovered the secrets and strategies of King An Dương. Meanwhile, King An Duong mistreated Cao Lỗ, and he left.

Zhong Shi had Mỵ Châu showed him the crossbow, at which point he secretly changed its trigger, neutralizing its special powers and rendering it useless. He then asked to return to his father, who thereupon launched a new attack on Âu Lạc and this time defeated King An Dương. History records that, with his defeat, the King was told by the turtle about his daughter's betrayal and killed his daughter for her treachery before going into the watery realm. (Note: ĐVSKTT (Peripheral Records/Volume 1:10a))

== Legacy ==
Vietnamese historians typically view the main events of the era as having roots in historical fact. However concordance of the history with Soviet doctrine of history was incomplete in the 1950s. The capital of King An Dương, Cổ Loa, was the first political center of the Vietnamese civilization pre-Sinitic era. The site consists of two outer sets of ramparts and a citadel on the inside, of rectangular shape. The moats consist of a series of streams, including the Hoang Giang River and a network of lakes that provided Cổ Loa with protection and navigation. Kim estimated the population of Cổ Loa possibly ranged from 5,000 to around 10,000 inhabitants.

== In popular culture ==
- The British video game Stronghold: Warlords.

== See also ==
- Đông Sơn culture
- History of Vietnam
- Hồng Bàng dynasty
- Lạc Việt
- Âu Việt
- Nam Việt
- Triệu dynasty
- Triệu Đà
- Phiên Ngung
- Trọng Thuỷ
- Âu Lạc
- Cổ Loa Citadel
- Tây Vu Vương
- Bách Việt

== Bibliography ==
=== Early ===
- Ngô Sĩ Liên, 蜀紀 [Thục Dynasty], 大越史記全書 [Đại Việt sử ký toàn thư, Complete Annals of Đại Việt], vol. Peripheral Records/Volume 1
- Li Daoyuan, 水经注 [Commentary on the Water Classic], vol. 37
- Sima Qian, 南越列傳 [The Account of Southern Yue], 史記 [Records of the Grand Historian], vol. 113

=== Modern ===
- Alves, Mark (2019). Data from Multiple Disciplines Connecting Vietic with the Dong Son Culture. Contact Zones and Colonialism in Southeast Asia and China's South (~221 BCE – 1700 CE). doi:10.13140/RG.2.2.32110.05446.
- Brindley, Erica (2015). Ancient China and the Yue: Perceptions and Identities on the Southern Frontier, c. 400 BCE–50 CE. Cambridge University Press. ISBN 978-110-70847-8-0.
- Buttinger, Joseph (1958). The Smaller Dragon: A Political History of Vietnam. Praeger Publishers.
- Calo, Ambra (2009). The Distribution of Bronze Drums in Early Southeast Asia: Trade Routes and Cultural Spheres. Oxford: Archaeopress. ISBN 9781407303963.
- Chapuis, Oscar (1995). A History of Vietnam: From Hong Bang to Tu Duc. Greenwood Press. ISBN 0-313-29622-7.
- De Vos, George A.; Slote, Walter H., eds. (1998). Confucianism and the Family. State University of New York Press. ISBN 978-0-791-43735-3.
- Dutton, George; Werner, Jayne; Whitmore, John K., eds. (2012). Sources of Vietnamese Tradition. Introduction to Asian Civilizations. Columbia University Press. ISBN 978-0-231-13862-8.
- Đào Duy Anh (2016) [1964]. Đất nước Việt Nam qua các đời: nghiên cứu địa lý học lịch sử Việt Nam (in Vietnamese). Nha Nam. ISBN 978-604-94-8700-2.
- Đào Duy Anh (2020) [1958]. Lịch sử Việt Nam: Từ nguồn gốc đến cuối thế kỷ XIX (in Vietnamese). Hanoi Publishing House. ISBN 978-604-556-114-0.
- Ferlus, Michael (2009). "A Layer of Dongsonian Vocabulary in Vietnamese". Journal of the Southeast Asian Linguistics Society. 1: 95–108.
- Hoàng, Anh Tuấn (2007). Silk for Silver: Dutch-Vietnamese Relations; 1637–1700. Brill. ISBN 978-90-04-15601-2.
- Higham, Charles (1989). The archaeology of mainland Southeast Asia. Cambridge University Press.
- Higham, Charles (1996). The Bronze Age of Southeast Asia. Cambridge University Press. ISBN 0-521-56505-7.
- Holmgren, Jennifer (1980). Chinese Colonization of Northern Vietnam: Administrative Geography and Political Development in the Tonking Delta, First To Sixth Centuries A.D. Australian National University Press.
- Kelley, Liam C. (2014). "Constructing Local Narratives: Spirits, Dreams, and Prophecies in the Medieval Red River Delta". In Anderson, James A.; Whitmore, John K. (eds.). China's Encounters on the South and Southwest: Reforging the Fiery Frontier Over Two Millennia. United States: Brills. pp. 78–106.
- Kelley, Liam C. (2013). "Tai Words and the Place of the Tai in the Vietnamese Past". The Journal of the Siam Society. 101 – via ResearchGate.
- Kiernan, Ben (2019). Việt Nam: a history from earliest time to the present. Oxford University Press. ISBN 978-0-190-05379-6.
- Kim, Nam C.; Lai, Van Toi; Trinh, Hoang Hiep (2010). "Co Loa: an investigation of Vietnam's ancient capital". Antiquity. 84 (326): 1011–1027. doi:10.1017/S0003598X00067041. S2CID 162065918.
- Kim, Nam C. (2015). The Origins of Ancient Vietnam. Oxford University Press. ISBN 978-0-199-98089-5.
- Kim, Nam C. (2020). "A Pathway to Emergent Social Complexity and State Power: A View from Southeast Asia". In Bondarenko, Dmitri M.; Kowalewski, Stephen A.; Small, David B. (eds.). The Evolution of Social Institutions. World-Systems Evolution and Global Futures. Springer Publishing. pp. 225–253. doi:10.1007/978-3-030-51437-2_10. ISBN 978-3-030-51436-5. S2CID 226486108.
- Leeming, David (2001). A Dictionary of Asian Mythology. Oxford University Press. ISBN 978-0-19-512052-3.
- Li, Tana (2011). "A Geopolitical Overview". In Li, Tana; Anderson, James A. (eds.). The Tongking Gulf Through History. Pennsylvania: University of Pennsylvania Press. pp. 1–25.
- Li, Tana (2011). "Jiaozhi (Giao Chỉ) in the Han Period Tongking Gulf". In Li, Tana; Anderson, James A. (eds.). The Tongking Gulf Through History. Pennsylvania: University of Pennsylvania Press. pp. 39–53. ISBN 978-0-812-20502-2.
- Lipson, Mark; Cheronet, Olivia; Mallick, Swapan; Rohland, Nadin; Oxenham, Marc; Pietrusewsky, Michael; Pryce, Thomas Oliver; Willis, Anna; Matsumura, Hirofumi; Buckley, Hallie; Domett, Kate; Hai, Nguyen Giang; Hiep, Trinh Hoang; Kyaw, Aung Aung; Win, Tin Tin; Pradier, Baptiste; Broomandkhoshbacht, Nasreen; Candilio, Francesca; Changmai, Piya; Fernandes, Daniel; Ferry, Matthew; Gamarra, Beatriz; Harney, Eadaoin; Kampuansai, Jatupol; Kutanan, Wibhu; Michel, Megan; Novak, Mario; Oppenheimer, Jonas; Sirak, Kendra; Stewardson, Kristin; Zhang, Zhao; Flegontov, Pavel; Pinhasi, Ron; Reich, David (2018-05-17). "Ancient genomes document multiple waves of migration in Southeast Asian prehistory". Science. 361 (6397). American Association for the Advancement of Science (AAAS): 92–95. Bibcode:2018Sci...361...92L. bioRxiv 10.1101/278374. doi:10.1126/science.aat3188. ISSN 0036-8075. PMC 6476732. PMID 29773666.
- Loewe, Michael (1986). "The Former Han dynasty". In Twitchett, Denis C.; Fairbank, John King (eds.). The Cambridge History of China: Volume 1, The Ch'in and Han Empires, 221 BC–AD 220. Cambridge: Cambridge University Press. pp. 110–128.
- Lockhart, Bruce; Duiker, William (2006). The A to Z of Vietnam. Lanham: Scarecrow Press.
- Miksic, John Norman; Yian, Go Geok (2016). Ancient Southeast Asia. Taylor & Francis. ISBN 978-1-317-27903-7.
- Milburn, Olivia (2010). The Glory of Yue: An Annotated Translation of the Yuejue shu. Sinica Leidensia. Vol. 93. Brill Publishers. ISBN 978-90474-4-399-5.
- Nguyen, Ba Khoach (1980). "Phung Nguyen". Asian Perspectives. 23 (1): 23–54.
- Mai, Cuong (2022). "Body of Jade, Pearls of Blood: The Evolution of the King An Dương Story and the Moral Imagination of Fifteenth-Century Đại Việt". Bulletin de l'École française d'Extrême-Orient.
- O'Harrow, Stephen (1979). "From Co-loa to the Trung Sisters' Revolt: Viet-Nam as the Chinese Found It". Asian Perspectives. 22 (2): 140–164. JSTOR 42928006.
- Jamieson, Neil L (1995). Understanding Vietnam. University of California Press. ISBN 978-0-520-20157-6.
- Paine, Lincoln (2013). The Sea and Civilization: A Maritime History of the World. Knopf Doubleday Publishing Group. ISBN 978-0-307-96225-6.
- Schafer, Edward Hetzel (1967). The Vermilion Bird: T'ang Images of the South. Los Angeles: University of California Press.
- Schuessler, Axel. (2007). An Etymological Dictionary of Old Chinese. University of Hawaii Press.
- Taylor, Keith (1980). "An Evaluation of the Chinese Period in Vietnamese History". The Journal of Asiatic Studies. 23 (1): 139–164.
- Taylor, Keith Weller (1983). The Birth of the Vietnam. University of California Press. ISBN 978-0-520-07417-0.
- Taylor, Keith Weller (2013). A History of the Vietnamese. Cambridge University Press. ISBN 978-0-521-87586-8.
- Tessitore, John (1989). "View from the East Mountain: An Examination of the Relationship Between the Dong Son and Lake Tien Civilizations in the First Millennium BC". Asian Perspectives. 28 (1): 31–44. JSTOR 42928187.
- Watson, Burton (1961). Records Of The Grand Historian Of China. Columbia University Press.
- Wu, Chunming; Rolett, Barry Vladimir (2019). Prehistoric Maritime Cultures and Seafaring in East Asia. Springer Singapore. ISBN 978-981-329-256-7.
- Yu, Ying-shih (1986). "Han foreign relations". In Twitchett, Denis C.; Fairbank, John King (eds.). The Cambridge History of China: Volume 1, The Ch'in and Han Empires, 221 BC–AD 220. Cambridge: Cambridge University Press. pp. 377–463.

An Dương Vương Thục Dynasty Died: 179 BC
| Preceded by Hùng Duệ Vương as King of Văn Lang | King of Âu Lạc; 257 BC – 179 BC | Succeeded by Triệu Đà as King of Nam Việt |
