= Âu Việt =

Ancient conglomeration of Baiyue tribes in Southeast Asia

Territorial divisions of Âu Việt and Văn Lang during the Hồng Bàng dynasty

The Âu Việt or Ouyue (Chinese: 甌越) were an ancient conglomeration of Baiyue tribes living in what is today the mountainous regions of northernmost Vietnam, western Guangdong, and northern Guangxi, China, since at least the third century BCE. They were believed to have belonged to the Tai-Kadai language group. In eastern China, the Ouyue established the Dong'ou or Eastern Ou kingdom. The Western Ou (西甌; pinyin: Xī Ōu; Tây meaning "western") were other Baiyue tribes, with short hair and tattoos, who blackened their teeth and are the ancestors of the modern upland Tai-speaking minority groups in Vietnam such as the Nùng and Tay, as well as the closely related Zhuang people of Guangxi.

The Âu Việt traded with the Lạc Việt, the inhabitants of the state of Văn Lang, located in the lowland plains to Âu Việt's south, in what is today the Red River Delta of northern Vietnam, until 258 or 257 BCE, when Thục Phán, the leader of an alliance of Âu Việt tribes, invaded Văn Lang and defeated the last Hùng king. He named the new nation "Âu Lạc", proclaiming himself "An Dương Vương" (literally "Peaceful Virile King"). The origins of Thục Phán are uncertain. According to traditional Vietnamese historiography, he was the prince or king of the Kingdom of Shu (in modern Sichuan). However the kingdom of Shu was conquered by the Qin in 316 BCE, making it chronologically improbable that Thục Phán was Shu royalty a hundred years later. There may be some merit to the story due to archaeological evidence of cultural ties between Yunnan and the Proto-Vietnamese, but possibly as a result of the gap in time between the origin of the story and when it was recorded, the location could have been changed to Shu or simply mistaken due to erroneous geographical knowledge. According to a translated oral account of a Tày legend, the western part of Âu Việt's land became the Nam Cương Kingdom, whose capital was located in what is today the Cao Bằng Province of Northeast Vietnam. It was there that Thục Phán hailed from. The authenticity of this account is considered suspect by some historians. It was published in 1963 as a translation while no extant copy of the original Tày text exists. The title of the story contains many Vietnamese words with slight tonal and spelling differences rather than Tai words. It is uncertain what text the translation originated from.

According to Chinese historians:

- The Qin dynasty conquered the state of Chu, unifying China. Qin abolished the noble status of the royal descendants of the state of Yue. After some years, Qin Shi Huang sent an army of 500,000 to conquer the West Ou. After three years, Qin forces killed West Ou chief Yiyusong (譯籲宋). Even so, West Ou waged guerilla warfare against Qin and slew Qin commander Tu Sui (屠睢) in retaliation.
- Before the Han dynasty, the East and West Ou regained independence. The Eastern Ou was attacked by the Minyue Kingdom, and Emperor Wu of Han allowed them to move to between the Yangtze and the Huai River. The Western Ou paid tribute to Nanyue until it was conquered by the Han. Descendants of these kings later lost their royal status. Ou (區), Ou (歐) and Ouyang (歐陽) remain as family names.

According to Vietnamese historians:

- 257 BCE, An Dương Vương 安陽王 unified the Lạc Việt tribe (Austroasiatic) (chiefdom) of Hung Kings 雄王 (Hưng Vương) with his Âuviệt tribe (Tai-Kadai) (chiefdom) into a single tribe (The Âulạc chiefdom).
- 208 BCE, Zhao Tuo captured Âulạc and incorporated it into his Han kingdom of Nanyue, which was ruled by the Han dynasty.

== Bibliography ==
- Kelley, Liam C. (2014). "Constructing Local Narratives: Spirits, Dreams, and Prophecies in the Medieval Red River Delta". In Anderson, James A.; Whitmore, John K. (eds.). China's Encounters on the South and Southwest: Reforging the Fiery Frontier Over Two Millennia. United States: Brill. pp. 78–106.
- Kelley, Liam C. (2013). "Tai Words and the Place of the Tai in the Vietnamese Past". The Journal of the Siam Society. 101 – via ResearchGate.
- O'Harrow, Stephen (1979). "From Co-loa to the Trung Sisters' Revolt: Viet-Nam as the Chinese Found It". Asian Perspectives. 22 (2): 140–164. JSTOR 42928006.
- Taylor, K.W. (2013), A History of the Vietnamese, Cambridge University Press
