= Liam Kelley =

American Vietnamologist (born 1966)

Liam C. Kelley
- Lê Minh Khải / 黎明凱
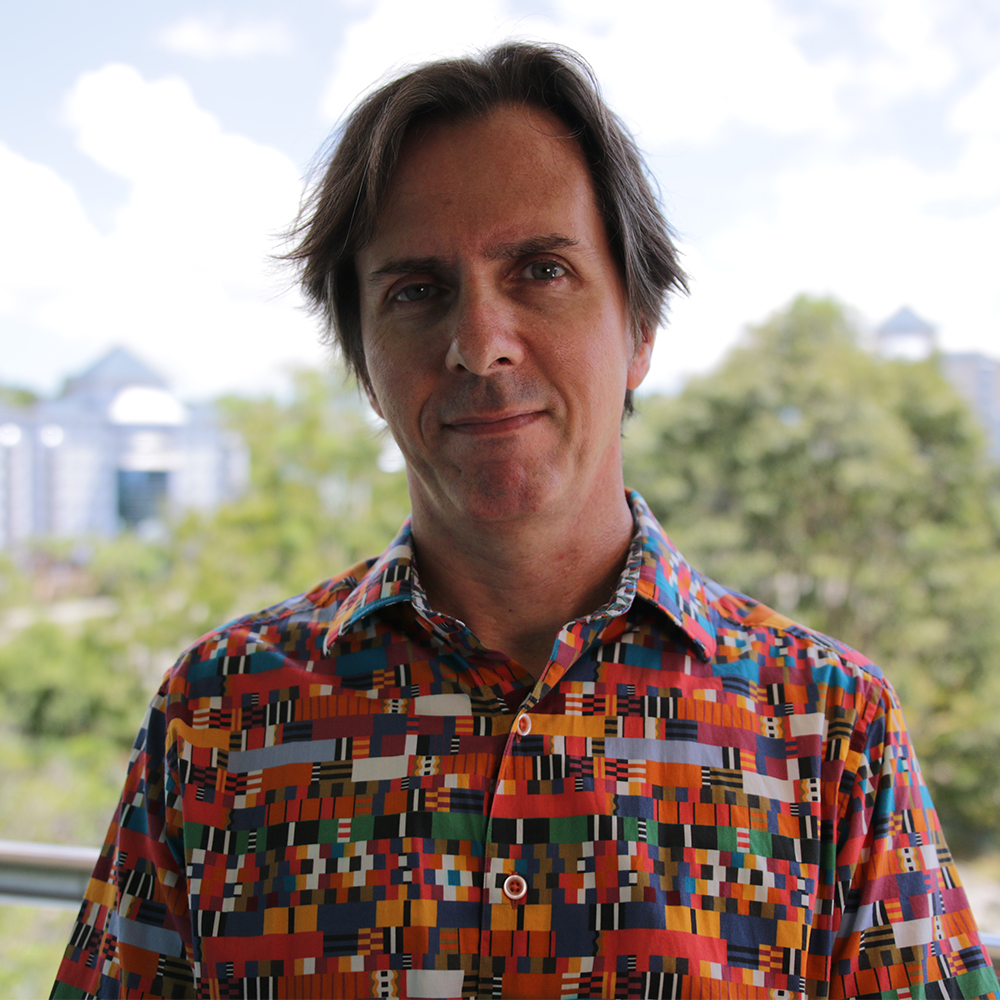
- Born: December 28, 1966; United States
- Education: Dartmouth College (BA); University of Hawaii (MA, D.Phil)
- Spouse: Phan Lê Hà
- Scientific career
- Fields: Southeast Asian history, Historiography
- Workplaces: University of Hawaiʻi, Universiti Brunei Darussalam
- Website: Le Minh Khai's SEAsian History Blog (and More!)

Seal
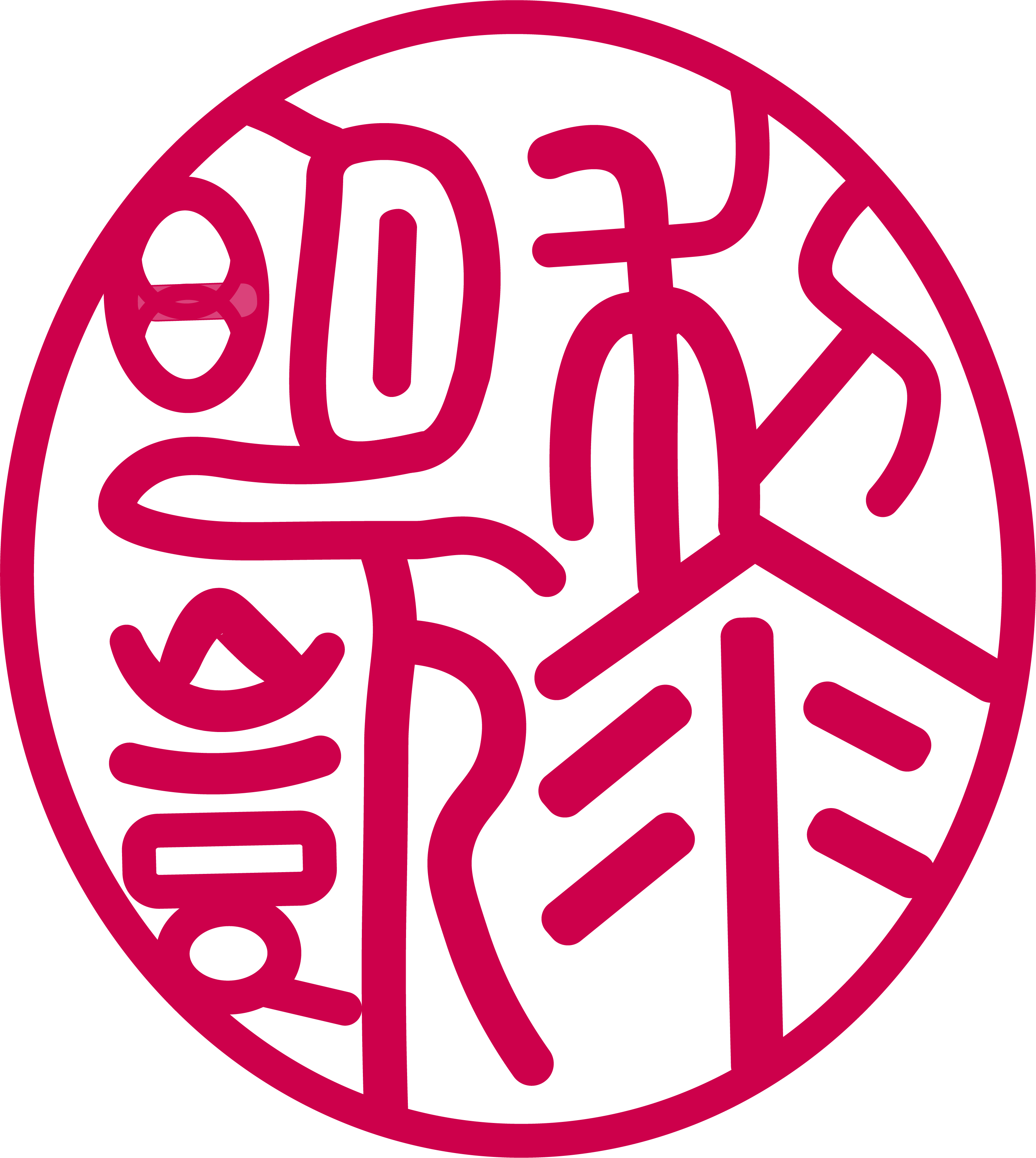

Liam Christopher Kelley (born 28 December 1966), or Lê Minh Khải (Traditional Chinese: 黎明凱), (Note: Sometimes written as Lê Minh Khai. Despite having adopted a Vietnamese name Vietnamese publications seem to refer to him either as "GS TS Liam C Kelley" or "L.C Ken-li". Alternative spellings for his Traditional Chinese name include 黎明愷 and 黎明開.) is an American Vietnamologist and a professor of Southeast Asian history and lecturer at the Universiti Brunei Darussalam, he formerly taught at the University of Hawaiʻi at Mānoa, Honolulu. His studies mainly focus on all periods in Vietnamese history, but he also teaches broadly on Southeast Asian, Asian and World History. Kelley also has a research interest in the digital humanities where he analyses and discusses the ways in which the Digital Revolution is transforming how scholars can produce and disseminate their ideas online and uses new digital media himself, such as a blog, for academic purposes.

Kelley is known for challenging many established beliefs in the field of Vietnamese history which he claims go unchallenged because of the nationalist narrative that affects the historiography of Vietnam. Further, he is known for his studies of Vietnamese "envoy poetry". Many of his critics describe his works as being Sinocentric and overemphasising the importance of Chinese culture and influence in Vietnamese history.

== Biography ==
=== Early life and education ===
Liam Kelley was born on 28 December 1966. He grew up in the state of Vermont. In 1989, he received his B.A. in Russian Language and Literature from Dartmouth College, Hanover, New Hampshire, United States. After this he decided to go to Taiwan to teach English "just for one year" but would spend four years on the island, while there he studied Mandarin Chinese at the same time that he was teaching English. During his years in Taiwan he had taken a number of trips to Thailand in the late 1980s and early 1990s which he fancied, his time in Taiwan and Thailand made him fascinated with both Classical Chinese and Southeast Asia so he decided to focus his studies on Vietnam because in his words "{G}iven that Vietnamese used to write in classical Chinese, and given the fact that I had never been to mainland China, and given the fact that a couple of trips to Thailand had peaked my interest in Southeast Asia, I decided to study more about it, and particularly about Vietnam." While in Taiwan someone gave him the Chinese name Li Ming Kai (黎明凱), a name inspired by the Hong Kong celebrity Leon Lai Ming (黎明), plus the name was chosen because its three characters are written in 36 strokes which makes it an auspicious name. The Vietnamese language reading of this name, Lê Minh Khải, is sometimes written as Lê Minh Khai without the dấu hỏi.

After returning to the United States he received his M.A. in 1996 and then his Ph.D. in 2001 both in Chinese history from the University of Hawaiʻi at Mānoa, where he would later teach himself. During the late 1990s, Kelley studied the Vietnamese language for four years at the University of Hawaii at Manoa while during those summers he would go to Hanoi and learn more of the language and culture.

=== Works and career ===
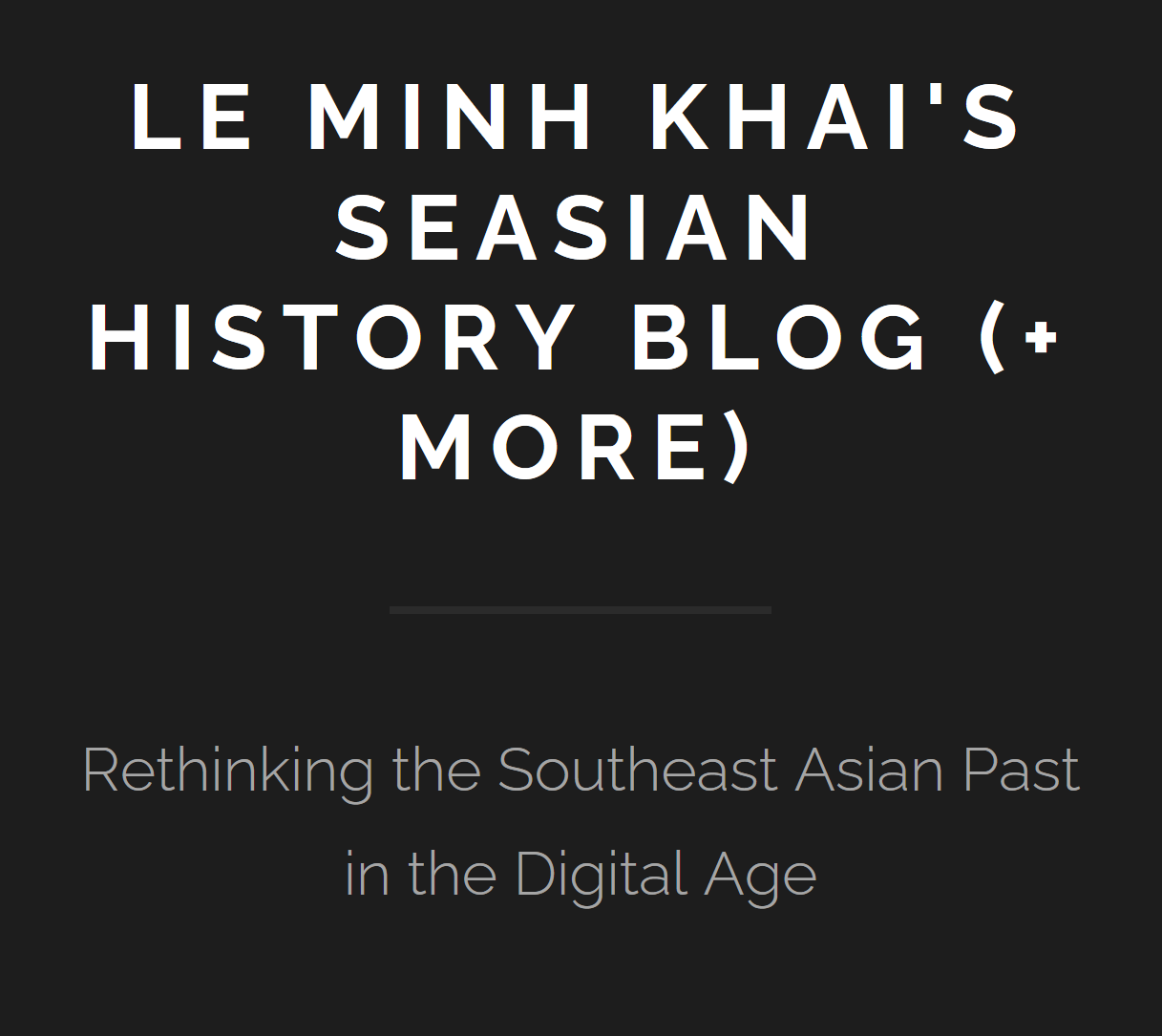
Kelley operates a blog about the history of, and scholarship on, Southeast Asia using the name "Lê Minh Khải".

His research and teaching focus on mainland Southeast Asian history and premodern Vietnamese history.

Kelley was a co-editor-in-chief of the Journal of Vietnamese Studies. He is currently co-editor in chief of the journal China and Asia: A Journal in Historical Studies. He has published a book on Vietnamese envoy poetry (known in Vietnamese as thơ đi sứ), co-edited a book on the southern borders of China, published articles and book chapters on the invention of traditions in "medieval Vietnam" (Việt Nam cổ trung đại), and the emergence of Vietnamese nationalism and spirit writing (giáng bút) in early twentieth century Vietnam under French domination. Kelley has also completed English language translations of several old Vietnamese texts such as the outer annals (ngoại kỷ) of the Đại Việt sử ký toàn thư and the Khâm định Việt sử thông giám cương mục.

In his first book Beyond the Bronze Pillars: Envoy Poetry and the Sino-Vietnamese Relationship published in 2005 Kelley examines much of the early scholarship concerning the Sino-Vietnamese relationship and noted that this early historical scholarship presented Vietnam as a "little China" (小中華, Tiểu Trung Hoa), while subsequent research made after World War II focused more on critiquing this theory. Kelley claimed that this resulted in an unwavering belief in what he calls the "not Chinese" theory of the history of Vietnam. Writing that many past historians in the field have often misinterpreted many historical Vietnamese documents and writings as a "literature of resistance to domination", instead Kelley presents that a large number of these historical writings did not concern Chinese domination over the country but internal problems and hostilities within Vietnam. According to Kelley in some instances the Vietnamese actually welcomed the Imperial Chinese military to take sides in Vietnam's own internal struggles, which he supports by pointing to specific historical Vietnamese texts and their authors who embraced the Chinese. American historian Keith Taylor claimed that "Liam Kelley has opened a new topic with his study of poetry written in classical Chinese by Vietnamese envoys to the Ming and Qing courts during the sixteenth to nineteenth centuries," adding that the book points out the "East Asian" connection of the educated Vietnamese of the time, which is often suppressed by Vietnamese nationalist historiography. In 2006 Kelley's works on "envoy poetry" were translated by Overseas Vietnamese Lê Quỳnh into the Vietnamese language.

Together with Tạ Chí Đại Trường he criticised the authenticity of the Hùng kings claiming that they were later invented and that their supposed historicity had no basis in reality. Tạ Chí Đại Trường claimed that the government of the Socialist Republic of Vietnam was unwilling to challenge the current narrative of the Hùng kings because of the adulation that the country had received in light of the Vietnam War by foreigners that admired the Communists' struggle that caused it to promote the previously vague myth of the Hùng kings to become a national legend taught unquestionably to the Vietnamese people as it's a powerful origin myth, making any critical discussion about the Hồng Bàng dynasty tense. Tạ Chí Đại Trường praised Kelley for challenging the myth and agrees with his general arguments, but noted that he still had some criticism towards a small number of points in his work on the subject.

Kelley operates a blog under his Vietnamese pseudonym, "Lê Minh Khải". His blog is subtitled "Always Rethinking the Southeast Asian Past."

Together with Professor Phan Lê Hà in the Sultan Hassanal Bolkiah Institute of Education (SHBIE), Professor Kelley organises an annual conference called "Engaging With Vietnam: An Interdisciplinary Dialogue". The conference itself was established by Phan Lê Hà in 2009, then at Monash University in Melbourne, Victoria, Australia, and has been held in Vietnam, Australia, the United States, and the Netherlands. The conference partners with a different university each year.

During the mid-2010s he was researching the efforts to discover the origins of the Vietnamese people by various people in modern times, from French scholars during the period of French domination to various later Vietnamese scholars that were active in the post-colonial era. During this time he had been back and forth in Vietnam, attending a number of seminars and publishing many articles largely to prove that the history and traditions of "anti-foreign aggression of the Vietnamese people" (Truyền thống chống ngoại xâm của dân tộc Việt Nam) are only recent pieces of fiction, and were cultural values that the Vietnamese people were proud to have only after establishing contact with the West. This working method has influenced the concepts and working methods of a number of authors, especially young authors, to change their views on Vietnamese history and how to research it.

In 2018 Kelley wrote on his blog challenging the narratives surrounding the Nguyễn dynasty's Tự Đức Emperor, while typically Tự Đức is presented as being Conservative and that his Conservatism and Confucianism didn't allow him to reform and modernise the country as had happened in contemporary Japan which eventually led to the French being able to overtake and conquer Đại Nam, on his blog Kelley states that he found two instances where the Tự Đức Emperor had ordered the Chinese edition of several classic books on science and industry from the West to be read by the mandarins and soldiers of the country. As an example he presented the book "Vạn Quốc Công Pháp" (萬國公法), a Chinese translation of The Elements of International Law, first published in 1836 by American lawyer Henry Wheaton, a book noted by many researchers to have made a profound contribution to the ideological transformation of the ruling elites in Qing China and Japan. It is noted that the very slow adoption of the ideas from this work in the Nguyễn dynasty showed how slow its elites adopted Western ideas and despite learning about Western ideas they were slow to adopt them or adapt to them.

In 2020 Kelley published The centrality of “fringe history”: Diaspora, the Internet and a new version of Vietnamese prehistory in the International Journal of Asia Pacific Studies which criticised the "new prehistory of Vietnam" and a lot of the scholarship surrounding the Hòa Bình culture. In his paper Kelley argued that Wilhelm Solheim had built the theory of "Southeast Asia as the earliest agricultural center" based on false archeological data and that the amateur Vietnamese historians on the internet and some members of the Vietnamese diaspora try to push a nationalistic view of the prehistoric period in Vietnam based on Solheim's earlier arguments from 1975. This work was later translated into Vietnamese by Võ Xuân Quế of the University of Social Sciences and Humanities (Ho Chi Minh City) (Trường Đại học Khoa học Xã hội và Nhân văn) in Hồ Chí Minh City, Vietnam, a part of the Vietnam National University.

== Envoy poetry ==
Beyond the Bronze Pillars: Envoy Poetry and the Sino-Vietnamese Relationship published in 2005 was based on research conducted at the Academia Sinica in Taiwan and the Institute of Hán-Nôm Studies in Hanoi, it focuses on the tributary ties between China and Vietnam from the late 16th to the early 19th centuries. While Patricia M. Pelley of the American Historical Association noted that while she finds the work to be "an extraordinary book based on some truly impressive research", she comments how some of the contents of the book are problematic. According to an article from Vietnamese-language BBC News, Kelley asserted that his analysis showed that these poems, which its author referred to as porcelain poems (Gian thơ đi sứ, rough translation: "compartment [containing] poems [written by] envoys going [abroad]"), (Note: "Porcelain poetry" is an otherwise uncommon, pun-based term used for "envoy poetry" that was used in this BBC News Tiếng Việt article; resulting from two etymologically unrelated meanings of sứ: the still-current "porcelain" as well as the historical "envoy".) showed that the Vietnamese elite at the time believed themselves to be a part of a "domain of manifest civility" (文獻之邦, Văn hiến chi bang) and that many envoys exclaimed their joys over witnessing many sights in China that they had only read about in their youths. The most controversial point of these studies is that they emphasised that there were no major difference between Chinese and Vietnamese elite or high culture, in light of a trend that Kelley described where over the past decades in writing about Vietnam historical works tended to focus on the "division between Vietnamese and Chinese culture." and noted that many historians tended to focus more on the Vietnamese side of this bilateral relationship. According to Kelley this antagonism couldn't be found in the documents of the time which rather reaffirmed an amicable and shared cultural understanding between the countries.

Historian Professor Keith Taylor commented on the book saying that if Vietnamese envoys and intellectuals are considered to be a minority, it is difficult to accept that the sentiments in their poems represent both the Vietnamese people and culture. As Taylor further added that Kelley ignored the differences between the educated Sinocentric elites and the general population that may have had a different experience and view of Chinese culture. Taylor noted in his comments about the book that it is a valuable contribution to increasing understanding of Vietnamese history and culture, but that Kelley's emphasis on the superiority of Chinese culture in the Vietnamese mind limits, not expands, the understanding of Vietnam. Note that Kelley himself states in the intro that "the ideas of the small number of envoys examined here were not necessarily shared by all Vietnamese, or even by all members of the Vietnamese elite, however that category might be defined" and argues that understanding envoy poetry would help people reconsider a number of basic ideas that people hold about the Vietnamese past such as there being a strong division between what is "Chinese" and what is "Vietnamese" during this period. While Kelley notes that what we today call "Chinese culture" was not perceived as being in any way alien or the possession of some other people by the Vietnamese envoys while noting that this poetry is not representative of how other members of the elites of Imperial Vietnam, but argued that "the passion and depth of these envoys’ beliefs suggests that they were probably not alone".

Historians Gabriel Tsang of the Sun Yat-sen University, Department of Chinese Language and Literature in Guangzhou, Guangdong and Hoang Yen Nguyen of the Vietnam National University, University of Social Sciences and Humanities in Ho Chi Minh City, noted that the systematic works of Kelley and Peng Qian (彭茜) demonstrate the sophisticated impact of Chinese Confucianism on the Vietnamese envoys and that their works describe the normal communication that existed between the courts of Imperial China and Imperial Vietnam that was based on the cultural congruity that existed between the two countries. But they noted that Kelley's works and research into the study of envoy poetry insufficiently investigated into the transformation and violation of Confucian manners and thoughts at specific historical moments by the official representatives of the courts.

== Views on scholarship of Vietnamese history ==
=== Vietnamese nationalist historiography ===
Kelley has often criticised historical scholarship in Vietnamese for their Nationalist biases, he claims that the academic scholarship in Vietnam is heavily influenced and politicised by the ideology of Vietnamese nationalism. Kelley says that publications in Vietnam in the field of premodern or precolonial history don't often produce new scholarship and only rarely produce new ideas or insights as they generally only publish very basic information about sources and dates. He claims that this happened because of what he describes as "academic politics" where scholars are discouraged from publishing works that go against the current political narratives. As an example Kelley notes that the historian Trần Ngọc Thêm during the 1980s and 1990s "praises" Kim Định, a French-trained, Vietnamese philosopher-historian who posited the idea that Chinese civilisation evolved from ancient Vietnamese agriculturalists, for loving the country of Vietnam and for loving the Vietnamese nation (yêu nước, yêu dân tộc) as well as for promoting "the spiritual values of the nation" (giá trị tinh thần đặc thù của dân tộc) during a time when the North Vietnamese were forced by the world of international communism to not hold nationalistic values in favour of socialist values. However, during these decades many Communist Parties started lessening their adherence to the ideology of socialism and embrace different values like tradition and nationalism in a phenomenon that some scholars call "Late Socialism". Kelley himself refers to the Vietnamese historian Kim Định as "the greatest historian of Vietnam (who is not known/not acknowledged.)" because he pushed for different ways of thinking in Vietnamese historiography, despite not thinking that Kim Định is a good scholar comparing him to the French anthropologist and ethnologist Claude Lévi-Strauss.

Kelley claims that in Vietnam what he calls "weak scholarship" goes unchallenged so more "weak scholarship" keeps getting build on it, he claims that meanwhile outside of Vietnam there were a lot of growths and advancements that occurred during the second half of the twentieth century in many academic fields that weren't actively participated in causing there to be a large gap between Vietnamese and some foreign academic scholarships of history. Kelley claims that Vietnamese scholars are unable to communicate with the outside academic world because they weren't exposed to the many different topics and approaches that scholars from outside the country were causing them to have not evolved with the modern historical academic scholarship. He claims that because outside scholars were exposed to these ideas for so long that they now take them for granted while many Vietnamese scholars have yet to be exposed to them.

"The concepts of “nation” and “identity” are two concepts that scholars in “the West” talked about endlessly in the 1980s and 1990s (although there is scholarship in the 1960s that starts to deal with this). To scholars in “the West,” nations and identities are concepts that are in people’s minds. To scholars in Vietnam, the Vietnamese nation and the Vietnamese identity are actual phenomena that truly exist and that can be identified. “Bản sắc” is how “identity” is translated into Vietnamese, but “bản sắc” [to Western historians] is NOT identity. Identity is imagined. It is constructed. It is relational. “Bản sắc” [to the Vietnamese] is “real.”

The different ways that Vietnamese and foreign scholars view these concepts leads to a massive difference in their ideas. However, it is not a mere difference of “perspective,” as there have been thousands of books and articles written outside of Vietnam that provide evidence for the constructed/imagined nature of nations/identity, but there is not a large body of scholarship which supports the Vietnamese view of what a nation and identity is."

— Liam Kelley's answer to the question "Would you please give an example of a gap in communication/knowledge between historians inside Vietnam and those working outside its borders?" asked by Đinh Từ Bích Thúy from the Da Mau Magazine (Tạp chí Da Màu).

Kelley has also criticised the projection of the "Vietnamese nation" (Dân tộc Việt Nam) into the past, for example he notes that scholarship that discusses the "Vietnamese nation" during the first millennium BCE wouldn't be accepted in the Western world because of different concepts of nations and their emergence as Western scholars view nations as being modern concepts that only emerge once countries establish a universal education system that can teach the inhabitants of the country that they belong to a "nation" which didn't exist during the premodern times. Kelley also argued that all history textbooks reflect political sentiments of the time and describes them as being "a politicised form of scholarship" noting that during the 1960s American students learned the history of the Western civilisation which he claimed made Americans think that their history was a part of a unique process that created a superior Western civilisation as opposed to learning about world history and world affairs as students started to learn afterwards as he claimed that people decided that the world would be a better place if Americans knew more about it.

To try to counter this nationalist historiography Kelley is very interested in tracing documents that other researchers were not interested in, because these documents did not signify "the spirit of autonomy throughout the nation's history" (không biểu thị cho tinh thần tự chủ xuyên suốt trong lịch sử dân tộc). Among his criticisms Kelley noted that in his analysis of "envoy poetry" he could not find any expression of resistance against China, but would describe it as a comprehensive affirmation of a world order on which the dynastic relations rely and of Vietnam's sub-position in that world. He went further by considering the thesis on national identity, anti-foreign policy literature, is just "projecting present ideas and feelings into the past" (phóng chiếu các ý niệm và cảm xúc hiện tại vào quá khứ). He claims that despite the fact that the concept of "independence" was only introduced to the Vietnamese at the beginning of the 20th century, scholars in Vietnam today are convinced that there was an independent kingdom in the Red River Delta in the first millennium BC, and that after a thousand years of Northern domination, that independent kingdom somehow reappeared and served as a Chinese tributary state for the next 1,000 years from the 10th to the 19th centuries. Vietnamese nationalists view these ideas as an important way to help Vietnamese people "gain more understanding" of the country, their ancestors, awaken self-esteem, and direct the social mood in the spirit of succession.

=== Views on Classical Chinese in scholarship about pre-20th century Vietnamese history ===
Kelley claims that it is impossible to understand the history of Vietnam before the 20th century without being able to read the Classical Chinese language, saying that no historian specialised in ancient Greece or Rome would be taken seriously if they weren't able to be able to read ancient Greek or Latin. According to Kelley it became acceptable to be a historian of premodern Vietnam during the second half of the 20th century without being able to understand literary Chinese. According to Kelley during the 1960s former mandarins of the Nguyễn dynasty with knowledge of the literary Chinese language began to pass away causing their linguistic and cultural knowledge to die with them as well. As the Classical Chinese language was dismissed as "feudal reactionary culture" in Vietnam and seen as "not authentically Southeast Asian" outside of the country such as in the United States, literary Chinese failed to be recognised as being important for Vietnamese history like the Latin language is for Roman and Medieval European history.

Kelley argues that this lack of knowledge about classical Chinese in the historical scholarship on Vietnam before the 20th century has caused a decrease in its quality both inside of Vietnam and in other countries.

Historian Benedict F. Kiernan criticised Kelley for exaggerating the role that a more Sinitic culture has defined Vietnam. While Kiernan writes that he agrees that Vietnamese history cannot be fully understood without its Chinese cultural background, he claims that Kelley overemphasises the importance of being able to understand Classical Chinese to learn about both Vietnamese and Southeast Asian history. Kiernan claims that Kelley disregards and diminishes Vietnamese scholars’ contributions to the field of Vietnamese history if they are unable to understand the Classical Chinese language, which Kiernan claims undervalues their works as he claims that Kelley overestimates the value of Classical Chinese. On his blog Kelley dismissed a number of passages from Kiernan's 2017 book Việt Nam: A History from Earliest Times to the Present based on the premise that Kiernan wasn't able to understand Vietnamese and Classical Chinese (despite Kiernan claiming to be able to speak some of the former), Kiernan criticised a number of assumptive claims made by Kelley in response on 1 December 2017 in the 23rd issue of the Asia-Pacific Journal: Japan Focus.

"Kelley is right on one key point. As he says on his blog, “It is impossible to write a survey of Vietnamese history (or of the history of any society for that matter) if one does not have the ability to understand and evaluate the historical sources (both primary and secondary).” His own unprofessional practice has proven that. He might have been in a better position to criticize had he written a definitive, synthetic history of Vietnam. It is clear why Kelley has written no such work, despite claiming the field as his own.

— Stretching the Sinitic Interpretation of Vietnamese History - Ben Kiernan, Asia-Pacific Journal: Japan Focus (01 December 2017 - Volume 15, Issue 23, Number 1, Article ID 5089).

Kiernan claimed that Kelley is also ready to criticise those "few academics" who work on pre-modern Vietnamese history "who can read the sources in classical Chinese." According to Kiernan, Kelley singles out a number of historians that can understand Classical Chinese as he claimed John K. Whitmore produced "a garbled translation" that "introduced some inaccuracies", Alexander B. Woodside for supposedly producing an erroneous date, and Lê Thành Khôi for authoring a "woefully outdated" (1981) book.

French historian Gerard Sasges stated in 2018 that "Despite Professor Kiernan's claims to the contrary, Kelley's wide-ranging and trenchant critique still stands." to rebuff a number of criticisms Kiernan presented against Kelley.

=== "Medieval Vietnamese invented traditions" ===
Kelley argues that over the centuries, the traditions that historians from Imperial Vietnam created have become second nature, and that during the second half of the 20th century under the influence of nationalism, the invented traditions of Imperial Vietnam have become and are becoming irreversible truths which he calls "Medieval Vietnamese invented traditions" (như một truyền thống được kiến tạo của người Việt Nam thời trung đại).

=== Văn hiến chi bang ===
Kelley notes that the historical Vietnamese saw themselves as a "domain of manifest civility" (文獻之邦, Văn hiến chi bang) and that they contrasted themselves with the "North" (China) and that many Vietnamese had an inferiority complex towards the North. Vietnamese historian Nguyễn Hòa claimed that Kelley's view on the status of Đại Việt being a Văn hiến chi bang was flawed and that the status wasn't declared by the Vietnamese themselves but awarded to Đại Việt by the Hongwu Emperor. Hòa also criticised the notion that Vietnam had an inferiority complex in relation to China and that Kelley misguidedly came to these conclusions by only looking at the historical texts and documents without looking at the greater historical context.

=== Social Darwinism amongst the educated indigenous elite of French Indochina ===
During the late 19th century and early 20th century the mandarins of the Nguyễn dynasty and other educated elite of French Indochina were introduced to works from Europe and the Americas through Chinese revolutionaries and are known in Vietnam as Tân thư (新書), (Note: Tân thư (a Sino-Vietnamese compound meaning "new books") is the common name of books and documents introducing new European-American ideas that appeared in Japan, China, Vietnam from the late 19th century to the beginning of the 20th century. Tân thư is a concept that used to distinguish these from the Cổ thư (古書; "ancient/old books"), the traditional cultural and ideological content, such as Confucian books.) Through the Tân thư, Vietnamese intellectuals come into contact with and received new knowledge from the outside world. This contact was both due to traditional exchanges and due to being closely related to the situation and plight of Japan and China – peoples who share a similar cultural background and were all facing a new form of colonialism that plots to annex not only the territory, but also westernise their culture. In this context, the development of Japan, the movement of thoughts according to the progressive trends in China could not fail to affect the thought and sentiment of progressive intellectuals in Vietnam at that time. They hoped to find a new direction for the nation from the Duy Tân (維新, "Renovation") movements in these two countries and with the Tân thư (see: Meiji Restoration), the spirit of enlightenment and many works of historical, political and philosophical studies. The West's presence in Vietnam, leading to the birth of movements based on news school of thought (Phong trào Tân học) that showed a new aspiration, a new awakening in social awareness that dominated Vietnam's educated minds at the time. During this same period of both modernisation and Westernisation a lot of, not only social but also, scientific vocabulary started to enter the Vietnamese language, such as máy bay (Aeroplane), tàu hỏa (Train), ô-tô (Automobile), xe máy - mô-tô (Motocyclette), áo vét (Veston), dầu tây (Petroleum),... đến tự do (Freedom), bình đẳng (Equality), bác ái (Charity), dân quyền (Civil rights), độc lập (Independence), yêu nước (Patriotism), dân tộc (Ethnicity, ethnic group), Etc.

Kelley claims that the developments during this period made the Vietnamese elite fearful of the warnings of the social evolution that nations could "easily disappear" if they were not strong enough, in response the reformed intellectuals in the early 20th century began to write Vietnamese history in radically new ways. According to Kelley it was during this period when ideas of independence and cultural differences began to hold key positions in Vietnamese historiography.

== Vietnamese criticism of Kelley's scholarship ==
=== Nhân Dân ===
==== Criticisms by Nguyễn Hòa ====
In February 2014 historian Nguyễn Hòa wrote two articles in Nhân Dân, the official newspaper of the Communist Party of Vietnam, criticising Kelly as an example of foreign authors making unconvincing theses in part of a larger trend of the expansion of international relations of Vietnam. Nguyễn Hòa noted that Kelley is not interested in the "hidden" and "non-textous" content of history and culture as he only seeks to research surviving texts often attempting to refute the cultural and historical values that are quite unified in the Vietnamese research community, as well as in the public consciousness in Vietnam. Hòa gave an example that in his assessment of the transformation of Vietnamese society during the early 20th century, Kelley noted that this was merely a cultural transition but Hòa argued that it would be better to see these societal transformations as a way of molding the "national spirit" (Tinh thần dân tộc) in context of being colonised. Nguyễn Hòa noted that the Vietnamese were eager to adopt scientific advancements from the West such as cars, aeroplanes, motorcycles, Etc. but were having more issues in adopting spiritual and social concepts from the West. Nguyễn Hòa argued that these kinds of concepts (phenomena related to freedom, equality, charity, civil rights, independence, patriotism, ethnicity, Etc.) existed beforehand in Vietnamese but that the previous generations of Vietnamese people simply didn't have the vocabulary to express these concepts and that Kelley fails to make these connections, arguing that while concepts and ideas cannot create reality and only express what is already there those that cannot express concepts are still bound to them and that it's up to later generations to analyse the past with these new concepts. Hòa argues that Kelley fails to see analysis from the sense of the researcher who tends to "modernise the past" by separating the text from the context and that earlier Vietnamese struggles to regain their ancestral land was proof that, even without those words, the Vietnamese had subconscious concepts of things like independence, patriotism, the nation, Etc. and that these things are impossible to survey by strictly focusing on the historical texts themselves and separating them from these modern concepts.

Nguyễn Hòa claims that Kelley's assessments of the historicity of the Hồng Bàng dynasty are short-sighted and that Kelley holds on to colonialism's "mission of civilisational enlightenment". Hòa further notes that Vietnam's tributary relationship to China, like those of Japan, Korea, and Thailand, was not a sign of submission to the superiority of Chinese culture but a recognition of Vietnam's sovereignty and that it was forced to act submissive because it's the only way for a small country to survive next to a big country and maintain a stable relationship with its bigger neighbour. Likewise, Hòa notes that Vietnam's worship of Confucius wasn't a sign of submission to China but that the Vietnamese had adopted Confucianism as a part of their own culture much like how Buddhism was integrated into Vietnamese culture, citing that Emperor Trần Nhân Tông created his own order of Zen Buddhism.

Another criticism of Kelley by Nguyễn Hòa revolves around the argument by solely focusing on the written texts that one cannot feel "the spirit of the times" by removing the words from their greater historical context giving him an inability to grasp the "hidden" and "non-written" nature of some past problems and events that were not stored by documents, but propagated in folklore and have been imprinted on the unconscious community, saying that using Kelley's methodology "it will be difficult to find convincing solutions" and that it's "easy to get caught up in the trend of subjective speculation". Hòa claims that after a thousand years of Chinese colonisation not many (if any) written records of Vietnamese survived and that folklore has become a place to store information about many events, historical, and cultural phenomena over the centuries. While Hòa does admit that using folklore isn't an optimal tool for historical research it makes it possible to remember the past of the country and the nation which are preserved and transmitted through "the collective memory of the Vietnamese people". Claiming that it's through this method that one can find the authenticity of the Hồng Bàng dynasty and that Kelley's criticism of the stories surrounding the pre-Chinese history of Vietnam present a challenge rather than demonstrating the scientific vision of the research surrounding Vietnam's ancient past. For his denial of Vietnam's ancient past and supposedly demonstrated centuries of patriotism and longing for independence Nguyễn Hòa claimed that Kelley was holding on to what he defined as "spiritual colonialism" (chủ nghĩa thực dân tinh thần).

"Or, as Nguyễn Thị Minh wrote in her essay about post-colonial translation theory: "exaggeration of a weakened, childish, lazy, and ignorant "other" is all about showing a superiority of Western culture" (phebinhvanhoc.com.vn, 21 July 2012)."

(Original Vietnamese)

"Hay, như Nguyễn Thị Minh Thương viết trong tiểu luận Lý luận dịch thuật hậu thực dân là: “cường điệu hóa về một “kẻ khác” suy yếu, ấu trĩ, lười biếng, mê muội, tất cả chỉ để hiển thị rõ hơn một văn hóa phương Tây ưu việt bội phần” (phebinhvanhoc.com.vn, ngày 21.7.2012)."

— Nghiên cứu phi lịch sử, hay thực hành “chủ nghĩa thực dân tinh thần”? (Kỳ 1) (Non-historical study, or the practice of "spiritual colonialism"? Part 1) - Nguyễn Hòa (Nhân Dân, Communist Party of Vietnam).

Nguyễn Hòa noted that in the past many countries created cultures and built a civilisation with their own writing systems but were later invaded and assimilated, and countries where the starting point in ancient times was still at a low level and were unable to record their history. Hòa claimed that only being dependent on the written record means that Kelley denies the legitimacy of passed on oral history in Vietnam saying that we can't treat all countries like his native United States which is a recently created nation and therefore has all of its origins thoroughly documented in a paper trial while the same cannot be said about Vietnam's ancient origins. Nguyễn Hòa states that the folklore of Vietnam surrounding its ancient origins can be compared with those of the modern-day Israel, where it is equally impossible to take the time of its establishment in 1948 without ignoring the history of thousands of years before Christ of the Jews; a people which have an equally legendary origin based on the story of Moses and that his staff was seen as a symbol of the Jewish people for countless of generations before the creation of their modern state. Meaning that Kelly's method of analysing ancient documents and criticising the folklore, which he claims are just "vivid fantasies", according Nguyễn Hòa is an irrational method as it denies the patriotic struggles of past heroes as the line between "history" and "folklore" can often become blurry which cannot be exclusively analysed using the scientific method.

Nguyễn Hòa warned people against quoting and analysing Kelley's works as he often requires authentic evidence, regardless of historical circumstance. Hòa pointed out that during the Fourth Era of Northern Domination the Yongle Emperor ordered that the Ming soldiers should destroy all and any works that they found written in the Vietnamese languages while all Chinese literature about Buddhism and Daoism should be preserved adding to the large gap in historical documentation of Đại Việt before this era. In the 20 years of Ming domination and destruction of Vietnamese books very little works were able to survive, which further makes Kelley's dependence on surviving works a flawed way to study Vietnamese history according to Nguyễn Hòa.

==== Criticisms by Lê Việt Anh ====
In June 2014 historian Lê Việt Anh wrote a piece in Nhân Dân, the official newspaper of the Communist Party of Vietnam, criticising Kelly (whom he referred to as "L.C Ken-li") for his views on Vietnamese history and called him a "Temple burner" (kẻ/người "đốt đền"). Lê Việt Anh noted that Kelley's reputation has emerged not because of his contributions to Vietnamese studies, but mainly due to a number of controversial works and articles about the need to change the system of the study of Vietnamese history. Kelley noted that Trần Quang Đức's Thousand years of caps and robes proved that "the Vietnamese were hanised" (người Việt đã bị Hán hóa) which Việt Anh noted was used by Kelley to deny the notion that people in East and Southeast Asia had selected elements from foreign cultural traditions and then "localised" (bản địa hóa) them to indigenous circumstances, as Kelley pushes for using Chinese culture and Chinese concepts to learn more about how the pre-modern Vietnamese thought. Việt Anh added that Trần Quang Đức himself noted that the Vietnamese always added unique variations.

Lê Việt Anh criticised Kelley for claiming that seeing sovereignty in ancient maps is "modernisation of the past" (hiện đại hóa quá khứ) and that people in the past didn't view national sovereignty in the way modern people do, related to the Hoàng Sa and Trường Sa insular territorial disputes. This was as Kelley concluded that "It seems to me that the French were the first to demonstrate the "peaceful and continuous expression of state power" over the Paracels." (Với tôi có vẻ như có một thực tế là người Pháp là những người đầu tiên chứng minh "sự thể hiện hòa bình và liên tục quyền lực nhà nước" đối với Paracels) based on the facts that the Nguyễn dynasty was the first Vietnamese state to claim the area and that the French were the first to actually establish a permanent presence there during the 1930s. Lê Việt Anh claimed that the Vietnamese people had a "national consciousness" and that the modern concept of "sovereignty" could be applied to it but that the people simply didn't have a term to express this "national consciousness" and that Vietnam has always had heroes that fought for the sovereignty of the country, such as the many national heroes that fought against the Song and Ming dynasties, but that Kelley deliberately didn't recognise this because in his view Vietnam was "Sinicised" (Hán hóa) and that the tributary relationship was an expression of dependence on the Chinese.

Việt Anh noted a number of controversial stances that Kelley had taken such as the claim that the Bình Ngô đại cáo wasn't a declaration of independence but discussed factions in Vietnamese society that supported the Ming, which Việt Anh claimed cannot be found in the text. Lê Việt Anh also claimed that Kelley's work which criticised the historical basis of the Hồng Bàng dynasty with nearly 90 annotations misunderstands the origins of the Vietnamese nation.

According to Lê Việt Anh understanding the histories of Vietnam, Japan, and Korea through the Sinocentric texts from the elites of the time doesn't reflect the independent nature of the peoples of these countries, as French cultural researchers found a rich folklore discussing the Vietnamese past and other cultural assets in the face of the Vietnamese Imperial court being dominated by the French. Which is why the "Hoa tâm" method of studying Vietnamese, Japanese, and Korean history isn't a perfect model especially in light of their independence comparable to the "cultural coercion" of the colonial states. With Việt Anh stating that these challenges have forced many researchers to change their old notions, as these old notions are seen as "offensive" (xúc phạm) and "simplistic" (đơn giản hóa) and that even well-trained American scholars, influenced by the Vietnamese concept of "little China", have more or less changed their views over the years to "reduce their bias", something which Kelley considers a cognitive error.

In the end of his article Lê Việt Anh warned other authors not to adopt Kelley's methods and perspectives and that he perceives the trends that Kelley is setting as undesirable noting that historical research should be careful when considering, evaluating, and concluding on a particular issue that, otherwise, it will not only "disturb social knowledge", but may also "lead to insults and misrepresentations of the core and good values that are the pride of the whole nation".

== Publications ==
- Batavia through the eyes of Vietnamese envoys, Center for Southeast Asian Studies, 1998.
- “Thoughts on a Chinese Diaspora: The Case of the Mạcs of Hà Tiên,” Crossroads: An Interdisciplinary Journal of Southeast Asian Studies 14.1 (2000): 71–98.
- Kelley, Liam Christopher. 2003. “Vietnam as a ‘Domain of Manifest Civility’ (Văn Hiến Chi Bang).” Journal of Southeast Asian Studies 3 (1): 63–76.
- Beyond the Bronze Pillars: Envoy Poetry and the Sino-Vietnamese Relationship, Association for Asian Studies/University of Hawaii Press (Honolulu, Hawaii), 2005.
- L Kelley - Divine Lord Wenchang Meets Great King Tran: Spirit Writing in Late Imperial/Colonial Vietnam, Beyond Teleologies” conference on the Colonial History of Vietnam ..., 2007.
- The biography of the Hồng Bàng clan as a medieval Vietnamese invented tradition, Journal of Vietnamese Study 7 (2), 87-130, 2012.
- Liam C. Kelley, “Tai Words and the Place of the Tai in the Vietnamese Past,” Journal of the Siam Society 101 (2013): 55-84.
- Liam C. Kelley, “Inventing Traditions in Fifteenth-Century Vietnam,” in Imperial China and Its Southern Neighbours, edited by Victor Mair and Liam C. Kelley (Singapore: Institute of Southeast Asian Studies, 2015), 161-193.
- Liam C. Kelley, “Moral Exemplar, Our General, Potent Deity, Confucian Moralizer and National Hero: The Transformations of Trần Hưng Đạo,” Modern Asian Studies 49.6 (2015): 1963-1993.
- Liam C. Kelley, “Constructing Local Narratives: Spirits: Dreams, and Prophecies in the Medieval Red River Delta,” in China's Encounters on the South and Southwest: Forging the Fiery Frontier, James Anderson and John K. Whitmore, eds. (Leiden: Brill, 2015), 78-105.
- Liam C. Kelley, “From a Reliant Land to a Kingdom in Asia: Premodern Geographic Knowledge and the Emergence of the Geo-Body in Late Imperial Vietnam,” Cross-Currents: East Asian History and Culture Review 5.2 (2016): 460-496.
- Liam Kelley, “Lost in Translation,” Mekong Review, Issue 9, November 2017.
- John D. Phan and Liam C. Kelley, eds., “Buddhist Literacy in Early Modern Vietnamese Print Culture,” Journal of Vietnamese Studies Vol. 13, No. 3 (2018).
- UN-IMAGINING “SRIVIJAYA” – A SERIES, 2020.
- Phan Lê Hà, Liam C. Kelley, and Jamie Gillen, “Introduction: The Collaboration Project between Engaging With Vietnam and the Journal of Vietnamese Studies,” Journal of Vietnamese Studies Vol. 15, No. 1 (2020): 1–5.
- Kelley, L. C. 2020. The centrality of “fringe history”: Diaspora, the Internet and a new version of Vietnamese prehistory. International Journal of Asia Pacific Studies 16 (1): 71–104, doi:10.21315/ijaps2020.16.1 Vol. 16, No. 1 (2020).
- Jamie Gillen, Liam C. Kelley, and Le Ha Phan - Vietnam at the Vanguard: New Perspectives Across Time, Space, and Community Editors, XIII chapters, 263 pages. Hardcover ISBN 978-981-16-5054-3; Softcover ISBN 978-981-16-5057-4; eBook ISBN 978-981-16-5055-0. Springer Nature Singapore Pte Ltd. (2021).
