= Lạc Việt =

Austroasiatic and Kra-Dai group in Vietnam

- Vietnamese alphabet: Lạc Việt
- Chữ Hán: 駱越 雒越

The Lạc Việt or Luoyue (駱越 or 雒越; pinyin: Luòyuè ← Middle Chinese: *lɑk̚-ɦʉɐt̚ ← Old Chinese *râk-wat) were an ancient conglomeration of peoples inhabiting northern Vietnam, particularly the ancient Red River Delta, from approximately 700 BC to 100 AD, during the last stage of the Neolithic and the beginning of the period of classical antiquity. They likely spoke Kra-Dai and Austroasiatic languages. From archaeological perspectives, they were known as the Dongsonian. The Lạc Việt were known for casting large Heger Type I bronze drums, cultivating paddy rice, and constructing dikes. The Lạc Việt who owned the Bronze Age Đông Sơn culture, which centered at the Red River Delta (in Northern Vietnam), are proposed to be the ancestors of the modern Kinh Vietnamese; another population of Luoyue, who inhabited the Zuo river's valley (now in modern Southern China), are proposed to be the ancestors of the modern Zhuang people; additionally, the Luoyue population in southern China are proposed to be ancestors of the Hlai people.

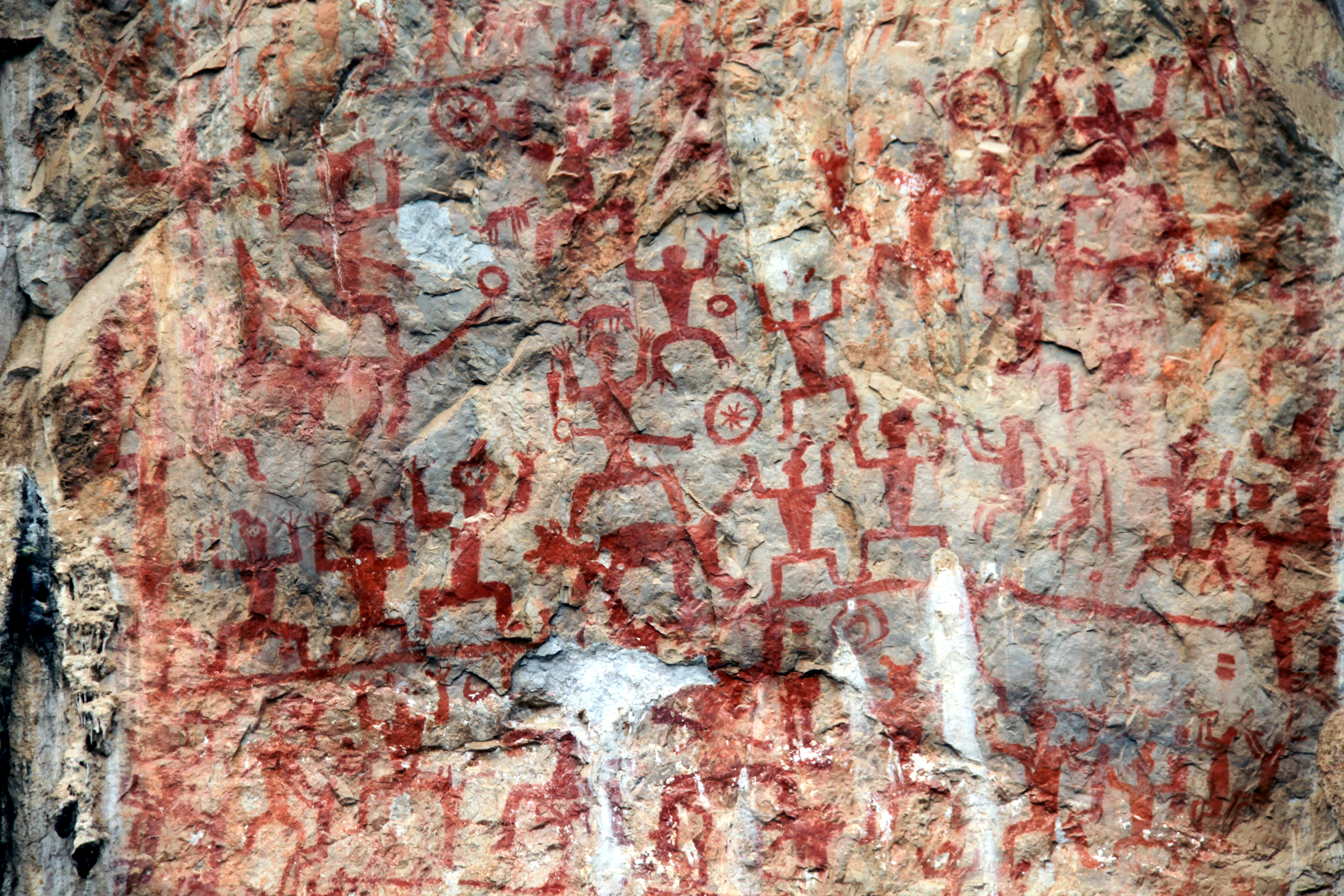
Detail of Zuojiang Huashan Rock Art

== Etymology ==
The etymology of the ethnonym Lạc applied to this people is uncertain.

Based on Chinese observers' remarks that the Lạc people's paddies depended on water-control systems like tidal-irrigation & draining, so that the floody, swampy Red River Delta might be suitable for agriculture, many scholars opted to find the etymology of Lạc in the semantic field "water":

- Japanese scholar Gotō Kimpei links Lạc to Vietnamese noun(s) lạch ~ rạch "ditch, canal, waterway".
- Vietnamese scholars Nguyễn Kim Thản and Vương Lộc (1974; apud Vũ Thế Ngọc, 1989 and Trần Trí Dõi, 2018) suggest that Lạc simply means "water" and is comparable to phonetically similar elements in such compounds nước rặc (Note: Mistakenly rendered as "nước rạc" in Vũ Thế Ngọc (1989)) (Note: Hồ Ngọc Đức's Free Vietnamese Dictionary Project glosses rặc as "means tidal water when falling") (lit. "ebbing (tidal) water"), cạn rặc (lit. "utterly dried up [of water]"), ruộng rặc (lit. "watery paddy") & ruộng rộc (Note: Hồ Ngọc Đức's Free Vietnamese Dictionary Project glosses rộc as "small and shallow rivulet") (Note: Hồ Ngọc Đức's Free Vietnamese Dictionary Project glosses ruộng rộc as "narrow sunken paddy-field between two mountainsides or hillsides") (lit. "watery paddy").
- Vũ Thế Ngọc (1989), Wu Zhongding (2012), and Huỳnh Sanh Thông (apud Kiernan, 2017) also propose that Lạc means "water" and is related to Austroasiatic words meaning "water" such as Vietnamese nước ~ nác (Vinh dialectal), Bahnar đák, Western Katu ດາກ (da:k), Khmer ទឹក (tɨk), etc.). (Note: Paul Sidwell (2024) reconstructs Proto-Austroasiatic *ɗaːkˀ "water", whose initial *ɗ- would become Vietnamese initial n-, not r- or l-, however.)

On the other hand, French linguist Michel Ferlus proposes that 駱/雒 (OC *rak) is monosyllabified from the areal ethnonym *b.rak ~ *p.rak by loss of the first element in the iambic cluster. The ethnonym *b.rak ~ *p.rak underlies *prɔːk, ethnonym of the Wa people, *rɔːk, ethonym of a Khmu subgroup, and possibly the ethnonym of Bai people (白族 Báizú). Ferlus also suggests that *b.rak ~ *p.rak underlies 百越 Bǎiyuè (< OC*prâk-wat)'s first syllable 百 Bǎi (< OC *prâk), initially just a phonogram to transcribe the ethnonym *p.rak ~ *b.rak yet later reconstrued as "hundred". Ferlus etymologises 百 bǎi < *p.rak and 白 bái < *b.rak, used to name populations south of China, as from etymon *p.ra:k "taro > edible tuber", which underlies Kra-Dai cognate words meaning "taro" (e.g. Thai เผือก pʰɨak^{D1}, Lakkia ja:k, Paha pɣaːk, etc. (Note: Norquest (2020) reconstructs Proto-Kra-Dai *pəˀrˠáːk "taro")); and Ferlus additionally proposes that *p.ra:k was used to by rice-growers to designate taro-growing horticulturists.

== History ==
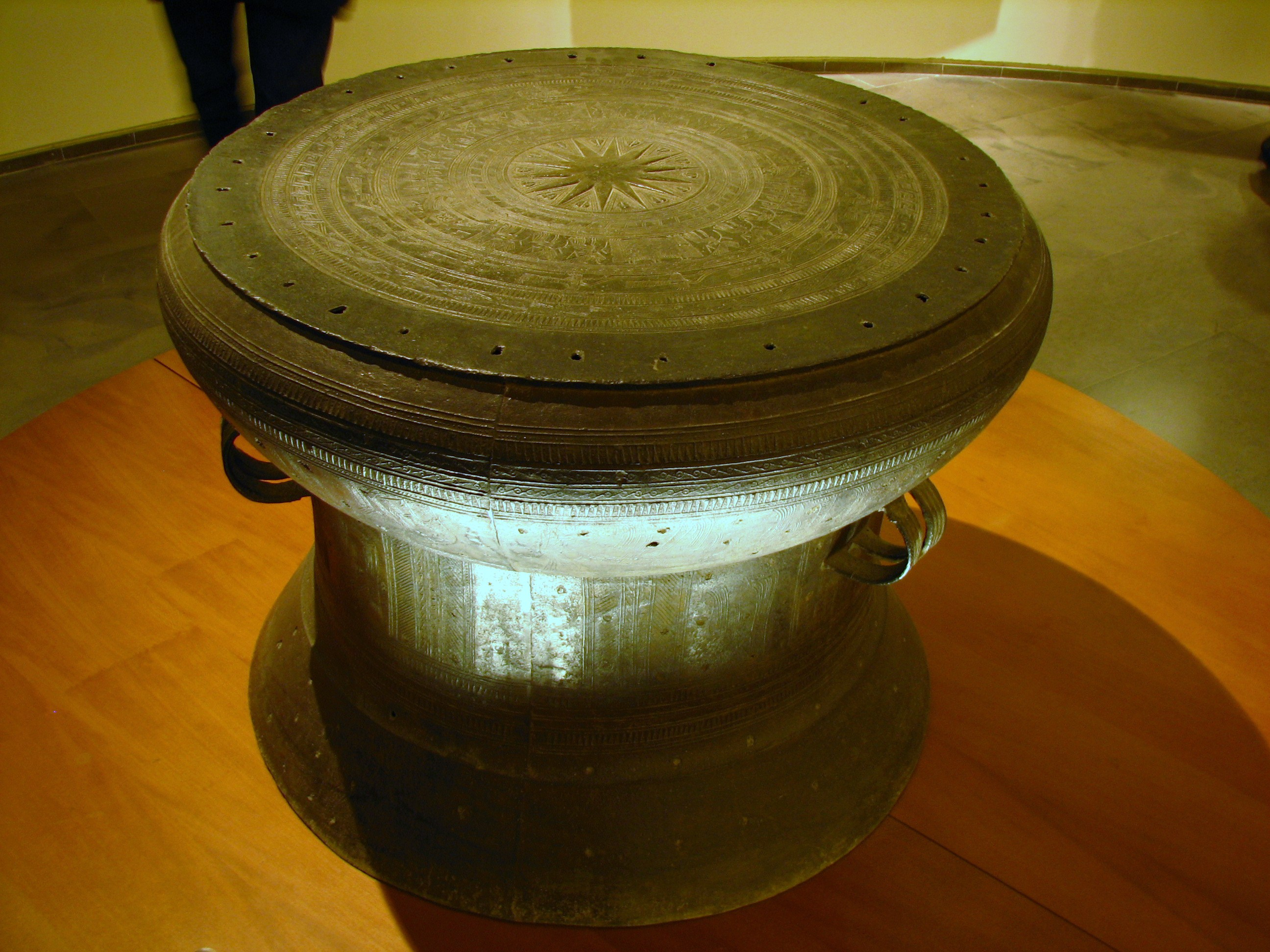
Dong Son drum displayed in Musee Guimet

According to a legend recorded in the Lĩnh Nam chích quái, the Lạc Việt founded a state called Văn Lang in 2879 BC. They formed a loose circle of power led by Lac lords and princes, the territory is subdivided into fiefs governed by hereditary chiefs. Their leaders were called Lạc kings (Hùng kings) who were served by Lạc marquises and Lạc generals. According to the Records of the Grand Historian by Sima Qian, Âu Lạc was referred as the "Western Ou" (v. Tây Âu) and "Luo" (v. Lạc) and they were lumped into the category of Baiyue by the Sinitic Han Chinese peoples to the north of them.

The Warring States period's encyclopedia Lüshi Chunqiu mentioned the name Yueluo 越駱 (SV: Việt Lạc), which the Han historian and philosopher Gao You asserted to be a country's name (國名). However, neither Lüshi Chunqiu nor Gao You indicated where Yueluo was located. Sinologists Knoblock and Riegel propose that Yueluo 越駱 was probably a mistake for Luoyue 駱越.

According to a fourth century chronicle, Thục Phán (King An Dương) led the Western Ou (Âu) tribe or the Âu Việt subdued the Luo tribes and formed the kingdom of Âu Lạc in around 257 BC. The new Âu overlords established their headquarters in Xiwu (Tây Vu), where they built a large citadel, known to history as Cổ Loa or Cổ Loa Thành, "Ancient Conch Citadel." When Zhao Tuo, founder of Nanyue, conquered Âu Lạc and established his rule over the region in 179 BC, these Lac princes became his vassals. In 111 BC, a militarily powerful Western Han dynasty conquered Nanyue and annexed the lands of the Lac Viet into the Han empire, and established the Jiaozhi, Jiuzhen and Rinan commanderies.

Reacting against a Chinese attempt to colonialize and civilize, the Trung sisters revolted against the Sinitic ruling class in 39 AD. After gaining a brief independence amid the Trung sisters' rebellion, Lac chiefs along with its social elites were massacred, deported, and forced to adopt Han cultures in a reactionary military response led by Chinese general Ma Yuan.

Later, Chinese historians writing of Ma Yuan's expedition referred to the Lac/Luo as the "Luoyue" or simply as the "Yue." Furthermore, there is no information and record about the Lac after 44 AD. (Note: One such last mention of the Luoyue was by Western Han official Jia Juanzhi during the Chuyuan years (48 - 44 BCE) of Emperor Yuan of Han's reign and recorded in the Han Shu (finished in 111 CE).) Some of them were hypothesized to have fled to the southern hinterlands.

== Language and genetics ==
The linguistic origins of the Lạc Việt have continued to remain controversial as they were generally believed to be Austroasiatic speakers. Specifically, they are thought to be Khmer-speaking by Sinologist Edward Schafer. French linguist Michel Ferlus in 2009 draws his conclusion that they were northern Vietic (Viet–Muong) speakers and believes that the Vietnamese are direct descendants of the Dongsonians (i.e. Lac Viet). Keith Taylor (2014) speculates that, the Lac Viet were either Proto-Viet-Muong speakers or Khmuic speakers, another Austroasiatic group who inhabit northwest Vietnam and northern Laos. James Chamberlain (2016), on the other hand, proposes that the Lac Viet were ancestors to Central Tai speakers and Southwestern Tai-speakers (including Thai people); however, based on layers of Chinese loanwords in proto-Southwestern Tai and other historical evidence, Pittayawat Pittayaporn (2014) proposes that the southwestward migration of southwestern Tai-speaking tribes from the modern Guangxi to the mainland of Southeast Asia must have taken place sometimes between the 8th–10th centuries CE at the earliest, long after 44BCE, when the Luoyue had been last mentioned.

Archaeological evidence reveals that during the pre-Dongson period, the Red River Delta was prominently Austroasiatic: for instance, genetic samples from the Mán Bạc burial site (dated 1,800 BC) have close proximity to modern Austroasiatic speakers, and then during the Dongson period, genetic examples yield to a significant proportion of Tai stocks (known as Au, Li-Lao) possibly living along with Vietic speakers.

== Culture and society ==
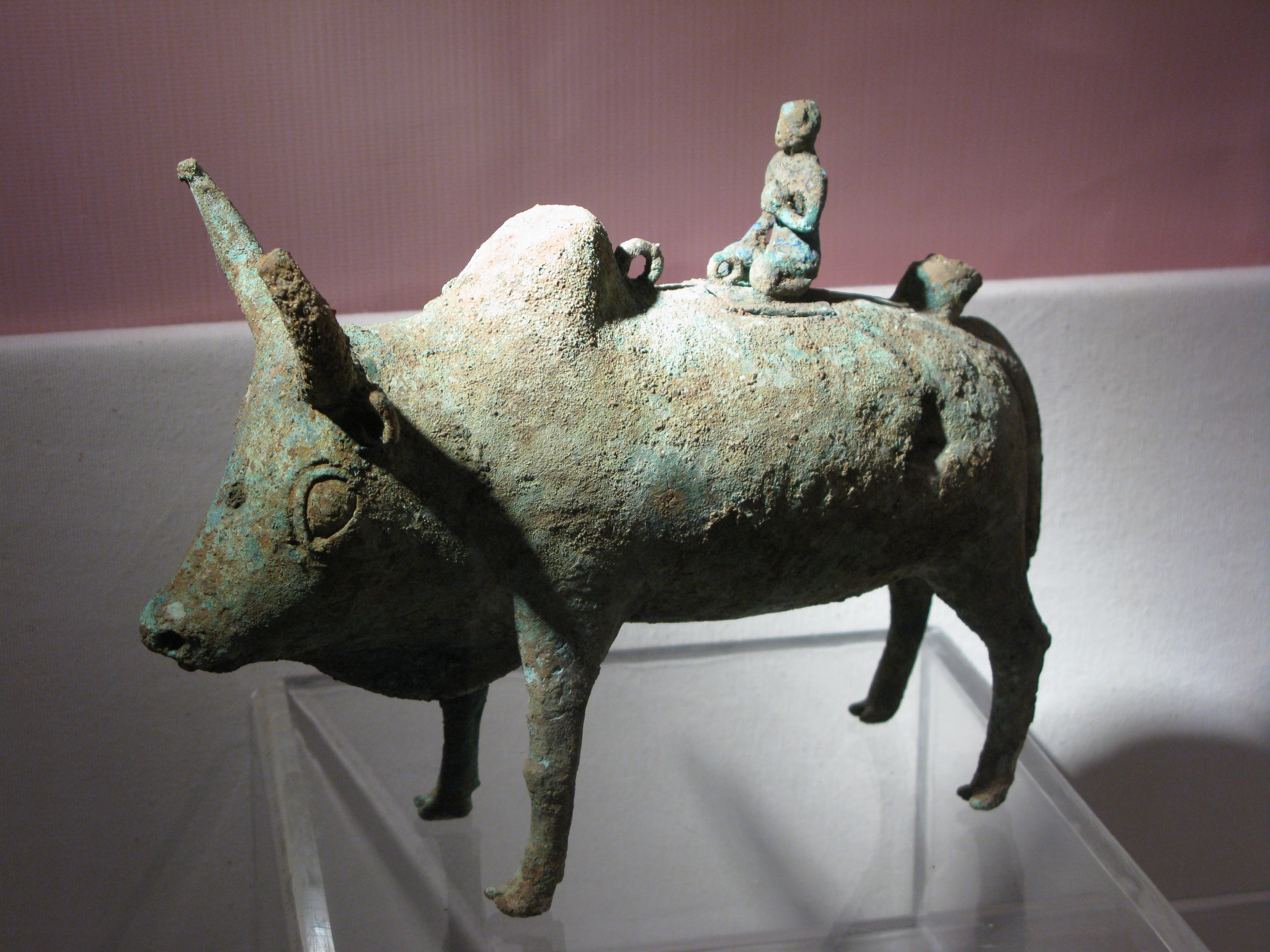
Water buffalo and farmer figure, 500 BCE

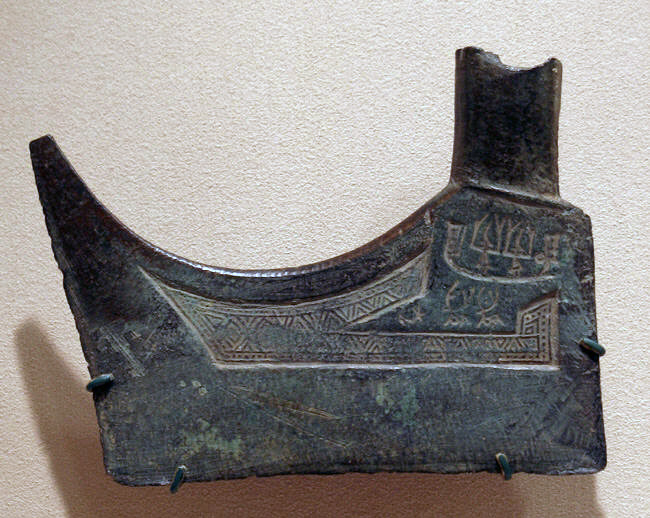
Luoyue axe, Northern Vietnam, 500 BCE. Metropolitan Museum of Art.

Lạc lords were hereditary aristocrats in something like a feudal system. The status of Lạc lords passed through the family line of one's mother and tribute was obtained from communities of agriculturalists who practiced group responsibility. In Lạc society, access to land was based on communal usage rather than individual ownership and women possessed inheritance rights. While in Chinese society men inherited wealth through their fathers, in Lạc society both men and women inherited wealth through their mothers.

Ancient Han Chinese had described the people of Âu Lạc as barbaric in need of civilizing, regarding them as lacking morals and modesty. Chinese chronicles maintain the native people in the Hong River Delta were deficient in knowledge of agriculture, metallurgy, politics, and their civilization was a by-product of Chinese colonization. They denied in situ cultural evolution or social complexity, attributing any development to Sinicization, though they were aware of this "stable, structured, productive, populous, and relatively sophisticated" society they encountered. A record from the 220s BCE reported "unorthodox customs" of inhabitants in parts of the region:"To crop the hair, decorate the body, rub pigment into arms and fasten garments on the left side is the way of the Baiyue. In the country of Xiwu (Vietnamese: Tây Vu) the habit is to blacken teeth, scar cheeks and wear caps of sheat [catfish] skin stitched crudely with an awl." Hou Hanshu described the region as thick with dense forests, and full of ponds and lakes, with countless wild animals like elephants, rhinoceros and tigers, while the locals earned their living by hunting and fishing, using bows propelling poisoned arrows, tattooing themselves, and wearing chignon and turbans. They also are said to know how to cast copper implements and pointed arrowheads, chewing betel nuts and blackening their teeth. However, such descriptions of the kingdom bear little resemblance to what we know: not a place of fertile cultivation or habitation on a large scale. Some of the descriptions may apply rather well to the region of present-day Guangxi and Guangdong, which remain inhospitable for many years to come, evident in census of the year 2 AD.

Women enjoyed high status in Lạc society. Such a society is a matrilocal society, a societal system in which a married couple resides with or near the wife's parents. Thus, the female offspring of a mother remain living in (or near) the mother's house, forming large clan-families couples after marriage would often go to live with the wife's family. It has also been said that Proto-Vietnamese society was matrilineal. The status of Lạc lords transferred through the mother's lineage while women possessed inheritance rights. In addition, they also practiced levirate, meaning widows had a right to marry a male relative of her late husband, often his brother, to obtain heirs. This practice provided an heir for the mother, protecting widows' interests and reflecting female authority, although some patriarchal societies used it to keep wealth within the male family bloodline.

The economy was characterized by agriculture with wet rice cultivation, draft animals, metal plowshares, axes and other tools, as well as irrigation complexes. The cultivation of irrigated rice may have started in the beginning of the second millennium BCE, evidenced by findings from palynological sequences, while metal tools were regularly used before any significant Sino-Vietic interaction. Chapuis (1995) also suggested the existence of line fishing and some specialization and division of labor. The region was also a major node or hub of interregional access and exchange, connected to other area through an extensive extraregional trade network, since well before the first millennium BC, thanks to its strategic location, enjoying access to key interaction routes and resources, including proximity to major rivers or the coast (Note: During the mid-Holocene transgression, the sea level rose and immersed low-lying areas; geological data show the coastline was located near present-day Hanoi.) and a high distribution of copper, tin, and lead ores. Kim (2015) believed its economic and commercial value, including its location and access to key waterways and exotic tropical goods, would have been main reasons the Chinese conquered the region, giving them unrestricted access to other parts of Southeast Asia.

== Contested ancestors and nationalism ==
The Lạc Việt's vague identity and heritage are claimed today by from both those in China and Vietnam. Nationalist scholarships from both sides misinterpret the Lạc Việt/Luoyue as a distinct ancient ethnic group with direct unbreakable connections to modern Vietnamese people (Kinh people) in Vietnam and Zhuang people in Southern China. Several Vietnamese scholars from the 1950s have argued that the Lạc Việt/Luoyue were exclusively ancestors of the Vietnamese Kinh people. On the Chinese side, the Lạc Việt/Luoyue are remembered as an ancient Zhuang kingdom and ancestors of the Zhuang. Lạc Việt/Luoyue however was a merely xenonym used by ancient Han Empire scribers to refer the tribal confederation in ancient Guangxi and Northern Vietnam whom they believed to be a variety of the Yue. These Yue and Luoyue likely refer to diverse groups of peoples speaking different languages who perhaps shared certain cultural practices, rather than to a clearly defined ethnic group speaking a single language.

== See also ==
- An Dương Vương
- Âu Lạc
- Âu Việt
- Đông Sơn culture
- History of Vietnam
- Hồng Bàng dynasty
- Hundred Yue
- Nam Việt
- Old Yue language
- Triệu dynasty

== Bibliography ==
- Alves, Mark (2019). Data from Multiple Disciplines Connecting Vietic with the Dong Son Culture. Conference: "Contact Zones and Colonialism in Southeast Asia and China's South (~221 BCE - 1700 CE).
- Brindley, Erica (2015). Ancient China and the Yue: Perceptions and Identities on the Southern Frontier, C.400 BCE-50 CE. Cambridge University Press. ISBN 978-1-107-08478-0.
- Watson, Burton (1961). Records Of The Grand Historian Of China. Columbia University Press.
- Calo, Ambra (2009). The Distribution of Bronze Drums in Early Southeast Asia: Trade Routes and Cultural Spheres. Oxford: Archaeopress. ISBN 9781407303963.
- Chamberlain, James R. (2000). "The origin of the Sek: implications for Tai and Vietnamese history" (PDF). In Burusphat, Somsonge (ed.). Proceedings of the International Conference on Tai Studies, July 29–31, 1998. Bangkok, Thailand: Institute of Language and Culture for Rural Development, Mahidol University. ISBN 974-85916-9-7.
- Chamberlain, James R. (2016). "Kra-Dai and the Proto-History of South China and Vietnam". Journal of the Siam Society. 104.
- Chapuis, Oscar (1995). A History of Vietnam: From Hong Bang to Tu Duc. Greenwood Press. ISBN 978-0-313-29622-2.
- Coedès, George (2015), The Making of South East Asia (RLE Modern East and South East Asia), Taylor & Francis, ISBN 9781317450955
- De Vos, George A.; Slote, Walter H., eds. (1998). Confucianism and the Family. State University of New York Press. ISBN 9780791437353.
- Dutton, George; Werner, Jayne; Whitmore, John K., eds. (2012). Sources of Vietnamese Tradition. Introduction to Asian Civilizations. Columbia University Press. ISBN 978-0-231-13862-8.
- Ferlus, Michel (2009a). "Formation of Ethnonyms in Southeast Asia". 42nd International Conference on Sino-Tibetan Languages and Linguistics. 31: 1–6 – via HAL.
- Ferlus, Michel (2009b). "A layer of Dongsonian vocabulary in Vietnamese" (PDF). Journal of the Southeast Asian Linguistics Society. 1. University of Hawaii Press: 95–108 – via HAL.
- Ferlus, Michel (2011). "Les Bǎiyuè 百越, ou les "pays des (horticulteurs/mangeurs de) tubercules"". Journées de Linguistique de l'Asie Orienta (in French). 24. Centre de Recherches Linguistiques sur l'Asie Orientale (EHESS-CNR): 1–12 – via HAL.
- Him, Mark Lai; Hsu, Madeline (2004). Becoming Chinese American: A History of Communities and Institutions. AltaMira Press. ISBN 978-0-759-10458-7.
- Higham, Charles (1996). The Bronze Age of Southeast Asia. Cambridge World Archaeology. ISBN 0-521-56505-7.
- Hoàng, Anh Tuấn (2007). Silk for Silver: Dutch-Vietnamese Rerlations; 1637 - 1700. BRILL. ISBN 978-90-04-15601-2.
- Kelley, Liam C. (2014), "Constructing Local Narratives: Spirits, Dreams, and Prophecies in the Medieval Red River Delta", in Anderson, James A.; Whitmore, John K. (eds.), China's Encounters on the South and Southwest: Reforging the Fiery Frontier Over Two Millennia, United States: Brill, pp. 78–106, ISBN 978-9-004-28248-3
- Kiernan, Ben (2019). Việt Nam: a history from earliest time to the present. Oxford University Press. ISBN 978-0-190-05379-6.
- Kim, Nam C.; Lai, Van Toi; Trinh, Hoang Hiep (2010). "Co Loa: an investigation of Vietnam's ancient capital". Antiquity. 84 (326): 1011–1027. doi:10.1017/S0003598X00067041. S2CID 162065918.
- Kim, Nam C. (2015). The Origins of Ancient Vietnam. Oxford University Press. ISBN 978-0-199-98089-5.
- Li, Tana (2011), "Jiaozhi (Giao Chỉ) in the Han Period Tongking Gulf", in Li, Tana; Anderson, James A. (eds.), The Tongking Gulf Through History, Pennsylvania: University of Pennsylvania Press, pp. 39–53, ISBN 978-0-812-20502-2
- Lim, Ivy Maria (2010). Lineage Society on the Southeastern Coast of China. Cambria Press. ISBN 978-1604977271.
- Lipson, Mark; Cheronet, Olivia; Mallick, Swapan; Rohland, Nadin; Oxenham, Marc; Pietrusewsky, Michael; Pryce, Thomas Oliver; Willis, Anna; Matsumura, Hirofumi; Buckley, Hallie; Domett, Kate; Hai, Nguyen Giang; Hiep, Trinh Hoang; Kyaw, Aung Aung; Win, Tin Tin; Pradier, Baptiste; Broomandkhoshbacht, Nasreen; Candilio, Francesca; Changmai, Piya; Fernandes, Daniel; Ferry, Matthew; Gamarra, Beatriz; Harney, Eadaoin; Kampuansai, Jatupol; Kutanan, Wibhu; Michel, Megan; Novak, Mario; Oppenheimer, Jonas; Sirak, Kendra; Stewardson, Kristin; Zhang, Zhao; Flegontov, Pavel; Pinhasi, Ron; Reich, David (2018-05-17). "Ancient genomes document multiple waves of migration in Southeast Asian prehistory". Science. 361 (6397). American Association for the Advancement of Science (AAAS): 92–95. Bibcode:2018Sci...361...92L. bioRxiv 10.1101/278374. doi:10.1126/science.aat3188. ISSN 0036-8075. PMC 6476732. PMID 29773666.
- Leeming, David (2001). A Dictionary of Asian Mythology. Oxford University Press. ISBN 9780195120523.
- Loewe, Michael (1986), "The Former Han dynasty", in Twitchett, Denis C.; Fairbank, John King (eds.), The Cambridge History of China: Volume 1, The Ch'in and Han Empires, 221 BC-AD 220, Cambridge: Cambridge University Press, pp. 110–128
- Lu, Yongxiang (2016). A History of Chinese Science and Technology. Springer. ISBN 978-3-662-51388-0.
- Milburn, Olivia (2010). The Glory of Yue: An Annotated Translation of the Yuejue shu. Sinica Leidensia. Vol. 93. Brill Publishers.
- Ngô Sĩ Liên, Đại Việt sử ký toàn thư (in Vietnamese)
- O'Harrow, Stephen (1979). "From Co-loa to the Trung Sisters' Revolt: Viet-Nam as the Chinese Found It". Asian Perspectives. 22 (2): 140–164. JSTOR 42928006.
- Peters, Heather (April 1990). H. Mair, Victor (ed.). "Tattooed Faces and Stilt Houses: Who were the Ancient Yue?" (PDF). Department of East Asian Languages and Civilizations, University of Pennsylvania. East Asian Collection. Sino-Platonic Papers. 17.
- Pittayaporn, Pittayawat (2014), "Layers of Chinese Loanwords in Proto-Southwestern Tai as Evidence for the Dating of the Spread of Southwestern Tai" (PDF), MANUSYA: Journal of Humanities, 17 (Special No. 20): 47–64, doi:10.1163/26659077-01703004.
- Marks, Robert B. (2017). China: An Environmental History. Rowman & Littlefield. ISBN 978-1-442-27789-2.
- SarDesai, D. R. (2005). Vietnam, Past and Present. Avalon Publishing. ISBN 9780813343082.
- Sharma, S. D. (2010). Rice: Origin, Antiquity and History. CRC Press. ISBN 978-1-57808-680-1.
- Schafer, Edward Hetzel (1967), The Vermilion Bird, Los Angeles: University of California Press, ISBN 978-0-520-01145-8
- Taylor, Keith Weller (1983). The Birth of the Vietnam. University of California Press. ISBN 978-0-520-07417-0.
- Taylor, Keith Weller (2013). A History of the Vietnamese. Cambridge University Press. ISBN 9780521875868.
- Tessitore, John (1989). "View from the East Mountain: An Examination of the Relationship Between the Dong Son and Lake Tien Civilizations in the First Millennium BC". Asian Perspectives. 28 (1): 31–44. JSTOR 42928187.
- Đào Duy Anh (1959). Lịch sử Cổ đại Việt Nam [越南古代史]. Translated by 刘统文; 子钺. China Science Publishing & Media.
- Wu, Chunming; Rolett, Barry Vladimir (2019). Prehistoric Maritime Cultures and Seafaring in East Asia. Springer Singapore. ISBN 978-9813292567.
- Yü, Ying-shih (1986). "Han Foreign Relations". In Twitchett, Dennis; Loewe, Michael (eds.). The Cambridge History of China, Volume 1: The Ch'in and Han Empires, 221 BC–AD 220. Cambridge: Cambridge University Press. ISBN 978-0-521-24327-8.
