= Âu Lạc =

Semi-legendary former country

Âu Lạc 甌貉 / 甌駱
- 257/208 BCE–208/179 BCE
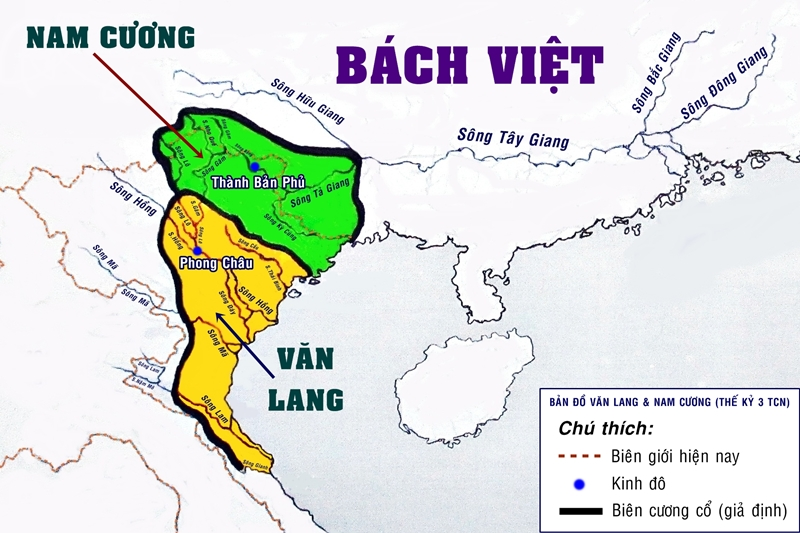
- In 257 BCE, Nam Cương, ruled by Âu Việt people (Green), conquered Văn Lang, ruled by Lạc Việt people (Yellow), and formed Âu Lạc
- Capital: Cổ Loa
- Government: Monarchy
- King
  - 257 BCE – 179 BCE: An Dương Vương (first and last)
- Historical era: Classical antiquity
  - Established: 257/208 BCE
  - Zhao Tuo annexed Âu Lạc: 208/179 BCE
Preceded by	Succeeded by
Nam Cương; Văn Lang	Nanyue
- Today part of: China; Vietnam

Thục
- Country: Kingdom of Âu Lạc
- Founded: 3rd century BC
- Founder: Thục Phán
- Final ruler: Thục Phán
- Titles: King of Âu Lạc
- Estate: Cổ Loa
- Deposition: 179 BC

Âu Lạc (Note: Kelley (2013) suggested An Dương Vương was a real historical figure, but the information provided by written accounts is very brief, only mentioning his rise to power, not the name for his kingdom. Only in the fifteenth century did the name Âu Lạc first appear. Furthermore, while from archeological findings it is evident that there was a "complex society" at Cổ Loa by the third century BCE, Kim (2015) was hesitant to associate these remains with Âu Lạc, and resorted to the name "Cổ Loa Polity" as an alternative.) (chữ Hán: 甌貉 (Note: ĐVSKTT (Peripheral Records/Volume 1:6a): "王既併文郎國，改國號曰甌貉國。" "The King then annexed the Văn Lang nation, changed the nation's name to Âu Lạc nation.") or 甌駱; (Note: Shiji (Volume 113): "且南方卑濕，蠻夷中間，其東閩越千人眾號稱王，其西甌駱裸國亦稱王。 Watson (1961, p. 242): "Moreover, this region of the south is low and damp and inhabited only by barbarian tribes. To the east of me is the chief of Min-yüeh who, with no more than a thousand subjects, calls himself a king, while to the west are the lands of Western Ou and Lo-lo, whose rulers likewise call themselves kings.") pinyin: Ōu Luò; Wade–Giles: Wu^{1}-lo^{4} Middle Chinese (ZS): *ʔəu-*lɑk̚ < Old Chinese *ʔô-râk) was a supposed polity that covered parts of modern-day Guangxi and northern Vietnam. Founded in 257 BCE by a figure called Thục Phán (King An Dương), it was a merger of Nam Cương (Âu Việt) and Văn Lang (Lạc Việt) but succumbed to the state of Nanyue in 179 BCE, which, itself was finally conquered by the Han dynasty. Other historical sources indicate that it existed from 257 BC to 208 BC or from 208 BC to 179 BC. Its capital was in Cổ Loa, present-day Hanoi, in the Red River Delta.

== History ==
=== Foundation ===
According to folklore, prior to Chinese domination of northern and north-central Vietnam, the region was ruled by a series of kingdoms called Văn Lang with a hierarchical government, headed by Lạc Kings (Hùng Kings), who were served by Lạc hầu and Lạc tướng. In approximately 257 BCE, Văn Lang was purportedly annexed by the Âu Việt leader Thục Phán, who according to traditional Vietnamese historiography, was either the prince or king of Shu. These Âu Việt people inhabited the southern part of the Zuo River, the drainage basin of You River and the upstream areas of the Lô, Gâm, and Cầu Rivers, according to Vietnamese historian Đào Duy Anh. The leader of the Âu Việt, Thục Phán, overthrew the last Hùng kings, and unified the two kingdoms, establishing the Âu Lạc polity and proclaiming himself King An Dương (An Dương Vương). According to Taylor (1983):

Our knowledge of the kingdom of Âu Lạc is a mixture of legend and history. King An Duong is the first figure in Vietnamese history documented by reliable historic sources, yet most of what we know about his reign survived in legendary form.

=== Construction of Cổ Loa Citadel ===
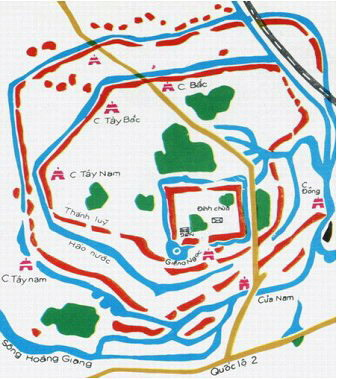
Map of Cổ Loa

Cổ Loa, the largest prehistoric moated urban settlement in Southeast Asia, was the first political hub of Vietnamese civilization in the pre-Sinitic era, encompassing 600 hectares (1,500 acres), and requiring as many as 2 million cubic meters of material. The construction might have begun as early as the fourth century BCE, while the middle phase of construction was between 300 and 100 BCE. The scale of Cổ Loa's rampart system, along with the complex forms of labor organization and labor expenses needed for its construction, demonstrated the polity's ability to produce enough surplus, mobilize resources, direct and ensure continued construction, as well as upkeep the citadel over time. This signaled a high degree of political centralization and a durable political authority that was highly "consolidated, institutionalized, and concentrated". Kim (2015) estimated that building such a large-scale project required between 3,171,300 and 5,285,500 person-days. It can provide "physical, symbolic, and psychological protection", showing off the polity's power and self-defense ability, thus deterring any potential threat.

Historical accounts claim, after purportedly taking power, Kinh An Dương ordered to construct a fortified settlement called Cổ Loa as his seat of power. It looked like a snail shell (its name, Cổ Loa 古螺, means "old snail": according to Đại Việt Sử Ký Toàn Thư, the citadel is shaped like a snail (Note: ĐVSKTT (Peripheral Records/Volume 1:6a): "王於是築城于越裳，廣千丈，盤旋如螺形，故號螺城。" "The King then built a citadel at Việt Thường, one-thousand-zhàng wide, whirling and swirling like the shape of a snail. Therefore, it was called Snail City (Loa Thành).")).

The events related to the construction of Cổ Loa are remembered in the legend of the golden turtle. According to this legend, when being built, the citadel saw all the work mysteriously undone by a group of spirits led by a thousand-year-old white chicken seeking to avenge the son of the previous King. In response to the King's plea, a giant golden turtle suddenly emerged from the water and protected the King until the citadel's completion. The turtle gave the King one of his claws before leaving and instructed him to make a crossbow using it as a trigger, assuring him he would be invincible with it. (Note: ĐVSKTT (Peripheral Records/Volume 1:6b–7b)") A man called Cao Lỗ (or Cao Thông) was tasked with creating that crossbow. It was then called "Saintly Crossbow of the Supernaturally Luminous Golden Claw" (靈光金爪神弩; SV: Linh Quang Kim Trảo Thần Nỏ); one shot could kill 300 men.

=== Collapse ===
In 204 BCE, in Panyu (now Guangzhou), Zhao Tuo established the kingdom of Nanyue. Taylor (1983) believed that when Nanyue and Âu Lạc co-existed, Âu Lạc temporarily acknowledged Nanyue to show their mutual anti-Han sentiment, and this did not imply that Nanyue exerted any real authority over Âu Lạc. Nanyue's influence over Âu Lạc waned after it normalized relations with the Han dynasty. The army Zhao Tuo had created to oppose the Han was now available to deploy against the Âu Lạc.

The details of the campaign were not authentically recorded. Zhao Tuo's early setbacks and eventual victory against King An Dương were mentioned in Records of the Outer Territory of Jiao Region (交州外域記) and Records of the Taikang Era of the Jin (晉太康記). (Note: These texts no longer remain today, but excerpts from them are preserved in a 6th-century work, Commentary on the Water Classic) (Note: Both were quoted in SJZ (Volume 37): "《交州外域記》曰：交趾昔未有郡縣之時，土地有雒田，其田從潮水上下，民墾食其田，因名爲雒民，設雒王、雒侯，主諸郡縣。縣多爲雒將，雒將銅印青綬。後蜀王子將兵三萬來討雒王、雒侯，服諸雒將，蜀王子因稱爲安陽王。後南越王尉佗舉衆攻安陽王，安陽王有神人名臯通，下輔佐，爲安陽王治神弩一張，一發殺三百人，南越王知不可戰，卻軍住武寧縣。按《晉太康記》，縣屬交趾。越遣太子名始，降服安陽王，稱臣事之。安陽王不知通神人，遇之無道，通便去，語王曰：能持此弩王天下，不能持此弩者亡天下。通去，安陽王有女名曰媚珠，見始端正，珠與始交通，始問珠，令取父弩視之，始見弩，便盜以鋸截弩訖，便逃歸報南越王。南越進兵攻之，安陽王發弩，弩折遂敗。安陽王下船逕出於海，今平道縣後王宮城見有故處。" Chang (2022, p. 49): "During the time when the Jiaozhi area was yet to be a commandery, there were Lạc lands. These were tidelands by the seashores. People farmed the lands and were called the Lạc people. The Lạc kings and Lạc lords were installed to reign over the lands, and Lạc generals were granted with bronze seals. Later, Prince Shu led a troop of 30 thousand to conquer the Lạc king, the Lạc lords, and the Lạcgenerals. Prince Shu thus became King AnDương. Then, Zhao Tuo the Nanyue King came to attack King An Dương. A holy man named Gao Tong came down [from heaven and] assisted King An Dương. Cao Tong gave him a divine crossbow that could kill three hundred people with a single shot. It was clear to King Nanyue that [Jiaozhi was] unbeatable, so he ordered his troops to stay in Wuning, a county that according to the Records of Taiking from the Jin Dynasty [266–420 century CE] was part of Jiaozhi. He then sent his son Shi to serve [and spy on] King An Dương, who offended Gao Tong because he was unaware of the identity of his adviser. Gao Tong therefore left the king, and before he departed, he informed him that whoever owned the crossbow would control All-Under-Heaven; likewise, whoever lost it would lose All-Under-heaven. King An Dương had a daughter named Mị Châu. She saw that Shi was a good looking man, and she had an affair with him. Shi asked Châu about the crossbow, so she ordered the crossbow to be brought out for Shi to take a look. Shi stole the crossbow and had it saw, and after he destroyed the crossbow he fled to inform King Nanyue [about thecrossbow]. Nanyue troops hence marched [toward the Lạc lands]. King An Dương tried to use the crossbow to fight back, but it was already useless, so he was defeated.") Records of the Grand Historian mentioned neither King An Duong nor Zhao Tuo's military conquest of Âu Lạc only that after Empress Lü's death (180 BCE), Zhao Tuo used his troops to menace and his wealth to bribe the Minyue, the Western Ou, and the Luo into submission. (Note: Shiji (Volume 113): "佗因此以兵威邊，財物賂遺閩越、西甌、駱，役屬焉，東西萬餘里。" Watson (1961, p. 241): "Chao T'o began once more to threaten the border with his forces. He sent gifts and bribes to the chiefs of Min-yüeh, Western Ou, and Lo-lo, persuading them to submit to his authority, until the region under his control extended over ten thousand li from east to west.") However, the campaign inspired a legend about the transfer of the crossbow. According to the myth, ownership of the crossbow conferred political power: "He who is able to hold this crossbow rules the realm; he who is not able to hold this crossbow will perish."

Unsuccessful on the battlefield, Zhao Tuo asked for a truce and sent his son Zhong Shi to King An Dương's court. Zhong Shi and Mỵ Châu, King An Duong's daughter, fell in love and were married. Matrilocal society required the husband to live in his wife's residence, so the couple stayed at An Duong's court. (Note: See also, for a different interpretation, Chang (2022, p. 50).) Meanwhile, King An Duong mistreated Cao Lỗ, and he left.

Zhong Shi had Mỵ Châu showed him the crossbow, at which point he secretly changed its trigger, rendering it useless. He then asked to return to his father, who thereupon launched a fresh attack on Âu Lạc and this time defeated King An Dương. The turtle then told the King about his daughter's betrayal and killed his daughter for her treachery before going into the watery realm. (Note: ĐVSKTT (Peripheral Records/Volume 1:10a)) It is possible that the magical crossbow may have been a type of new model army under Cao Thông's command that was influenced by the technologies and innovations from the Warring States.

Zhao Tuo then incorporated the regions into Nanyue but left the indigenous chiefs controlling the population. This was the first time the region formed part of a polity headed by a Chinese ruler. Zhao Tuo sent two officials to supervise the Âu Lạc lords, one in the Red River Delta, named Giao Chỉ, and one in the Mã and Cả River, named Cửu Chân. Their chief interest seemed to be trade; and their influence was limited outside one or two outposts. Local society remained unchanged.

In 111 BCE, a militarily powerful Han dynasty conquered Nanyue and ruled it for the next several hundred years. Just as under Nanyue, political power was in the hands of local lords. "Seals and ribbons" were bestowed upon these local leaders as their status symbol, in return, they paid "tribute to a suzerain" but the Han officials considered this as "taxes". Indigenous ways of life and ruling class did not experience significant Sinitic impact into the first century C.E. It was not until the fourth decade of the first century C.E. that the Han government imposed more direct rule and ramped up efforts at sinicization. The Han fully consolidated their control, replacing the loose tribute system by a full Han administration and ruling the region directly as provinces. Before that, while "some form of nominal northern hegemony was installed", there was no evidence that any Chinese-style enterprise controlled the region during the second or first centuries BCE as certain historical accounts are relatively Sinocentric and misleading as to the nature of Proto-Vietnamese society before the "real, later imposition of full Chinese power."

== Government and society ==
Based on evidence from the historical and archaeological records, Kim (2015) believed that a "highly centralized, overarching state-level society with enduring political institutions and structure" between 300 and 100 BCE was responsible for the construction of the Cổ Loa settlement. Its size and the requisite workforce to construct it implied "a strong military force and significant centralized, state-like control". The number of bronze tools also suggested the existence of centralized production, social stratification, and material monopolization. That roof tiles can only be found at Cổ Loa also indicated that the site was the capital. Surrounding villages and communities seem to have paid taxes to the centralized polity.

The Han Chinese had described the people of Âu Lạc as barbaric in need of civilizing, regarding them as lacking morals and modesty. Chinese chronicles maintain the indigenous people in the Red River Delta were deficient in knowledge of agriculture, metallurgy, politics, and their civilization was merely a transplanted by-product of Chinese colonization. They denied in situ cultural evolution or social complexity, attributing any development to sinicization, though they were aware of this "stable, structured, productive, populous, and relatively sophisticated" society that they encountered.

Women enjoyed high status in Lạc society. Such a society is a matrilocal society, a societal system in which a married couple resides with or near the wife's parents. Thus, the female offspring of a mother remain living in (or near) the mother's house, forming large clan-families couples after marriage would often go to live with the wife's family. It has also been said that Proto-Vietnamese society was matrilineal. The status of Lạc lords transferred through the mother's lineage while women had inheritance rights. In addition, they also practiced levirate, meaning widows had a right to marry a male relative of her late husband, often his brother, to obtain heirs. This practice provided an heir for the mother, protecting widows' interests and reflecting female authority, although some patriarchal societies used it to keep wealth within the male family bloodline.

== Demographics ==
There was a high population level in the region prior to the arrival of the Han dynasty. It is estimated that the population for Cổ Loa and the environs was thousands of people, and for the greater delta region the population was tens of thousands of people, if not hundreds of thousands. This is supported by the census of A.D. 2, according to which three prefectures of Giao Chỉ, Cửu Chân and Nhật Nam contained 981,755 people. Although some can be attributable to immigration from the north, Han immigration into northern Vietnam was not overwhelming during this time, and population levels were not affected until after the middle of the second century.

Later Chinese officials called the local people Lạc (Lou) and Âu (Ou). The Lac people are generally believed to be Austroasiatic speakers. Taylor (2013) believed the lowland population mostly spoke Proto-Viet-Muong while those from the mountainous areas north and west of the Red River Delta spoke an ancient language similar to modern Khmu. French linguist Michel Ferlus in 2009 concludes that the Vietnamese are the "most direct heirs" of Đông Sơn culture (c. 7th BC to 1st AD), which was "precisely located in the North of Vietnam". Specifically, Ferlus (2009) showed that the inventions of pestle, oar and a pan to cook sticky rice, which is the main characteristic of the Đông Sơn culture, correspond to the creation of new lexicons for these inventions in Northern Vietic (Việt–Mường) and Central Vietic (Cuoi-Toum). The new vocabularies of these inventions were proven to be derivatives from original verbs rather than borrowed lexical items. On the other hand, the Âu possibly spoke a language related to the Tai-Kadai language family. Archaeological evidence reveals that during the pre-Dongson period, the Red River Delta was prominently Austroasiatic, such as genetic samples from the Mán Bạc burial site (dated 1,800 BCE) have close proximity to modern Austroasiatic speakers, and then during the Dongson period, genetic examples yield to a significant proportion of Tai stocks (known as Au, Li-Lao) possibly living along with Vietic speakers.

== Economy ==
The economy was characterized by agriculture with wet rice cultivation, draft animals, metal plowshares, axes and other tools, as well as irrigation complexes. The cultivation of irrigated rice may have started in the beginning of the second millennium BCE, evidenced by findings from palynological sequences, while metal tools were regularly used before any significant Sino-Vietic interaction. Chapuis (1995) also suggested the existence of line fishing and some specialization and division of labor.

Northern Vietnam was also a major hub of interregional access and exchange, connected to other area through an extensive extraregional trade network, since well before the first millennium BC, thanks to its strategic location, access to key interaction routes and resources, including proximity to major rivers or the coast (Note: During the mid-Holocene transgression, the sea level rose and immersed low-lying areas; geological data show the coastline was located near present-day Hanoi.) and a high distribution of copper, tin, and lead ores. Kim (2015) believed its economic and commercial value, including its location and access to key waterways and exotic tropical goods, would have been main reasons the Chinese conquered the region, giving them unrestricted access to other parts of Southeast Asia.

== See also ==
- An Dương Vương
- Âu Việt
- Baiyue
- Cổ Loa Citadel
- Đông Sơn culture
- History of Vietnam
- Hồng Bàng dynasty
- Lạc Việt
- Nam Việt
- Panyu District
- Tây Vu Vương
- Triệu dynasty
- Trọng Thủy
- Zhao Tuo

== Bibliography ==
=== Early ===
- Ngô Sĩ Liên, 蜀紀 [Thục Dynasty], 大越史記全書 [Đại Việt sử ký toàn thư, Complete Annals of Đại Việt], Peripheral Records/Volume 1
- Li Daoyuan, 水经注 [Commentary on the Water Classic], Volume 37
- Sima Qian, 南越列傳 [The Account of Southern Yue], 史記 [Records of the Grand Historian], Volume 113

=== Modern ===
- Alves, Mark (2019). Data from Multiple Disciplines Connecting Vietic with the Dong Son Culture. Contact Zones and Colonialism in Southeast Asia and China's South (~221 BCE – 1700 CE). doi:10.13140/RG.2.2.32110.05446.
- Brindley, Erica (2015). Ancient China and the Yue: Perceptions and Identities on the Southern Frontier, c. 400 BCE–50 CE. Cambridge University Press. ISBN 978-110-70847-8-0.
- Buttinger, Joseph (1958). The Smaller Dragon: A Political History of Vietnam. Praeger Publishers.
- Calo, Ambra (2009). The Distribution of Bronze Drums in Early Southeast Asia: Trade Routes and Cultural Spheres. Oxford: Archaeopress. ISBN 9781407303963.
- Chang, Yufen (2022). "Academic Dependency Theory and the Politics of Agency in Area Studies: The Case of Anglophone Vietnamese Studies from the 1960s to the 2010s". Journal of Historical Sociology. 35 (1). John Wiley & Sons, Ltd: 37–54. doi:10.1111/johs.12363. eISSN 1467-6443. ISSN 0952-1909. S2CID 247835010.
- Chapuis, Oscar (1995). A History of Vietnam: From Hong Bang to Tu Duc. Greenwood Press. ISBN 0-313-29622-7.
- De Vos, George A.; Slote, Walter H., eds. (1998). Confucianism and the Family. State University of New York Press. ISBN 978-0-791-43735-3.
- Dutton, George; Werner, Jayne; Whitmore, John K., eds. (2012). Sources of Vietnamese Tradition. Introduction to Asian Civilizations. Columbia University Press. ISBN 978-0-231-13862-8.
- Đào Duy Anh (2016) [1964]. Đất nước Việt Nam qua các đời: nghiên cứu địa lý học lịch sử Việt Nam (in Vietnamese). Nha Nam. ISBN 978-604-94-8700-2.
- Đào Duy Anh (2020) [1958]. Lịch sử Việt Nam: Từ nguồn gốc đến cuối thế kỷ XIX (in Vietnamese). Hanoi Publishing House. ISBN 978-604-556-114-0.
- Ferlus, Michael (2009). "A Layer of Dongsonian Vocabulary in Vietnamese". Journal of the Southeast Asian Linguistics Society. 1: 95–108.
- Hilgers, Lauren (2016). "Vietnam's First City". Archaeology. 69 (4). Archaeological Institute of America: 48–53. JSTOR 26348729.
- Hoàng, Anh Tuấn (2007). Silk for Silver: Dutch-Vietnamese Rerlations; 1637–1700. Brill. ISBN 978-90-04-15601-2.
- Higham, Charles (1989). The archaeology of mainland Southeast Asia. Cambridge University Press.
- Higham, Charles (1996). The Bronze Age of Southeast Asia. Cambridge University Press. ISBN 0-521-56505-7.
- Holmgren, Jennifer (1980). Chinese Colonization of Northern Vietnam: Administrative Geography and Political Development in the Tonking Delta, First To Sixth Centuries A.D. Australian National University Press.
- Kelley, Liam C. (2014). "Constructing Local Narratives: Spirits, Dreams, and Prophecies in the Medieval Red River Delta". In Anderson, James A.; Whitmore, John K. (eds.). China's Encounters on the South and Southwest: Reforging the Fiery Frontier Over Two Millennia. United States: Brills. pp. 78–106.
- Kelley, Liam C. (2013). "Tai Words and the Place of the Tai in the Vietnamese Past". The Journal of the Siam Society. 101 – via ResearchGate.
- Kiernan, Ben (2019). Việt Nam: a history from earliest time to the present. Oxford University Press. ISBN 978-0-190-05379-6.
- Kim, Nam C.; Lai, Van Toi; Trinh, Hoang Hiep (2010). "Co Loa: an investigation of Vietnam's ancient capital". Antiquity. 84 (326): 1011–1027. doi:10.1017/S0003598X00067041. S2CID 162065918.
- Kim, Nam C. (2015). The Origins of Ancient Vietnam. Oxford University Press. ISBN 978-0-199-98089-5.
- Kim, Nam C. (2020). "A Pathway to Emergent Social Complexity and State Power: A View from Southeast Asia". In Bondarenko, Dmitri M.; Kowalewski, Stephen A.; Small, David B. (eds.). The Evolution of Social Institutions. World-Systems Evolution and Global Futures. Springer Publishing. pp. 225–253. doi:10.1007/978-3-030-51437-2_10. ISBN 978-3-030-51436-5. S2CID 226486108.
- Leeming, David (2001). A Dictionary of Asian Mythology. Oxford University Press. ISBN 978-0-19-512052-3.
- Li, Tana (2011). "A Geopolitical Overview". In Li, Tana; Anderson, James A. (eds.). The Tongking Gulf Through History. Pennsylvania: University of Pennsylvania Press. pp. 1–25.
- Li, Tana (2011). "Jiaozhi (Giao Chỉ) in the Han Period Tongking Gulf". In Li, Tana; Anderson, James A. (eds.). The Tongking Gulf Through History. Pennsylvania: University of Pennsylvania Press. pp. 39–53. ISBN 978-0-812-20502-2.
- Lipson, Mark; Cheronet, Olivia; Mallick, Swapan; Rohland, Nadin; Oxenham, Marc; Pietrusewsky, Michael; Pryce, Thomas Oliver; Willis, Anna; Matsumura, Hirofumi; Buckley, Hallie; Domett, Kate; Hai, Nguyen Giang; Hiep, Trinh Hoang; Kyaw, Aung Aung; Win, Tin Tin; Pradier, Baptiste; Broomandkhoshbacht, Nasreen; Candilio, Francesca; Changmai, Piya; Fernandes, Daniel; Ferry, Matthew; Gamarra, Beatriz; Harney, Eadaoin; Kampuansai, Jatupol; Kutanan, Wibhu; Michel, Megan; Novak, Mario; Oppenheimer, Jonas; Sirak, Kendra; Stewardson, Kristin; Zhang, Zhao; Flegontov, Pavel; Pinhasi, Ron; Reich, David (May 17, 2018). "Ancient genomes document multiple waves of migration in Southeast Asian prehistory". Science. 361 (6397). American Association for the Advancement of Science (AAAS): 92–95. Bibcode:2018Sci...361...92L. bioRxiv 10.1101/278374. doi:10.1126/science.aat3188. ISSN 0036-8075. PMC 6476732. PMID 29773666.
- Loewe, Michael (1986). "The Former Han dynasty". In Twitchett, Denis C.; Fairbank, John King (eds.). The Cambridge History of China: Volume 1, The Ch'in and Han Empires, 221 BC–AD 220. Cambridge: Cambridge University Press. pp. 110–128.
- Lockhart, Bruce; Duiker, William (2006). The A to Z of Vietnam. Lanham: Scarecrow Press.
- Miksic, John Norman; Yian, Go Geok (2016). Ancient Southeast Asia. Taylor & Francis. ISBN 978-1-317-27903-7.
- Nguyen, Ba Khoach (1980). "Phung Nguyen". Asian Perspectives. 23 (1). University of Hawai'i Press: 23–53. JSTOR 42929153.
- O'Harrow, Stephen (1979). "From Co-loa to the Trung Sisters' Revolt: Viet-Nam as the Chinese Found It". Asian Perspectives. 22 (2): 140–164. JSTOR 42928006.
- Jamieson, Neil L (1995). Understanding Vietnam. University of California Press. ISBN 978-0-520-20157-6.
- Paine, Lincoln (2013). The Sea and Civilization: A Maritime History of the World. Knopf Doubleday Publishing Group. ISBN 978-0-307-96225-6.
- Phan Huy Lê; Trần Quốc Vượng; Hà Văn Tấn; Lương Ninh (1991). Lịch sử Việt Nam. Vol. 1.
- Schafer, Edward Hetzel (1967). The Vermilion Bird: T'ang Images of the South. Los Angeles: University of California Press.
- Schuessler, Axel. (2007). An Etymological Dictionary of Old Chinese. University of Hawaii Press.
- Taylor, Keith (1980). "An Evaluation of the Chinese Period in Vietnamese History". The Journal of Asiatic Studies. 23 (1): 139–164.
- Taylor, Keith Weller (1983). The Birth of the Vietnam. University of California Press. ISBN 978-0-520-07417-0.
- Taylor, Keith Weller (2013). A History of the Vietnamese. Cambridge University Press. ISBN 978-0-521-87586-8.
- Tessitore, John (1989). "View from the East Mountain: An Examination of the Relationship Between the Dong Son and Lake Tien Civilizations in the First Millennium BC". Asian Perspectives. 28 (1): 31–44. JSTOR 42928187.
- Watson, Burton (1961). Records Of The Grand Historian Of China. Columbia University Press.
- Wu, Chunming; Rolett, Barry Vladimir (2019). Prehistoric Maritime Cultures and Seafaring in East Asia. Springer Singapore. ISBN 978-981-329-256-7.
- Yu, Ying-shih (1986). "Han foreign relations". In Twitchett, Denis C.; Fairbank, John King (eds.). The Cambridge History of China: Volume 1, The Ch'in and Han Empires, 221 BC–AD 220. Cambridge: Cambridge University Press. pp. 377–463.
