= Khao tom =

Southeast Asian dessert

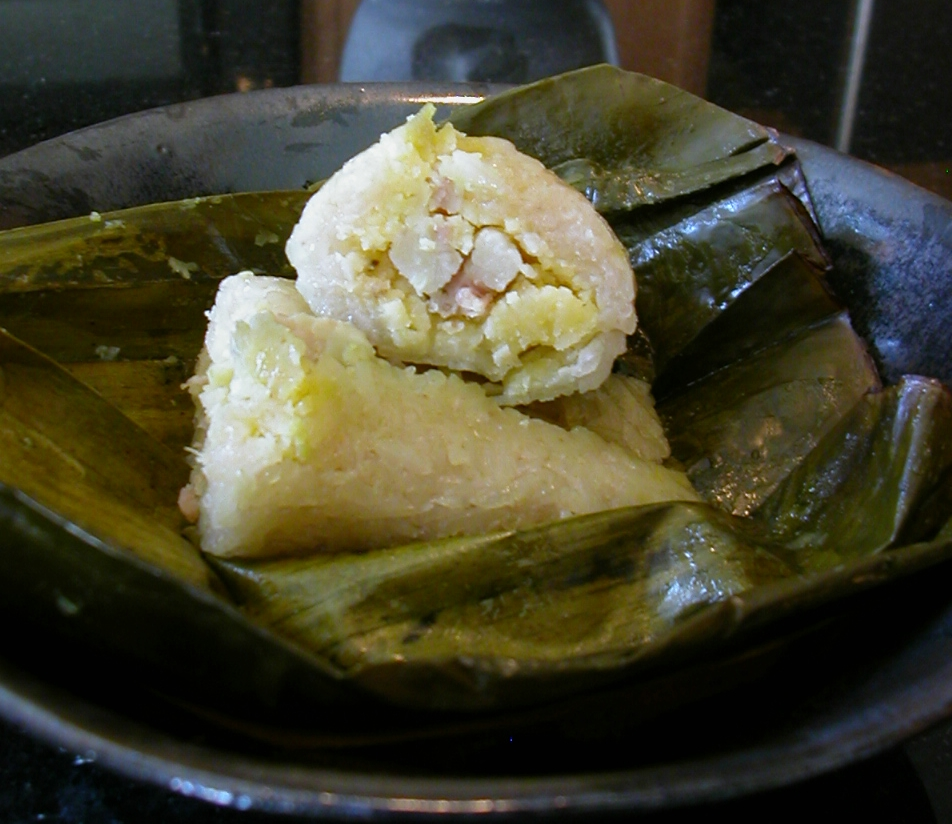
- Khao tom can be either savory or sweet. This one from Laos, with a pork fat and mung bean filling, is savory.
- Alternative names: Khao tom mat Khao tom phat
- Course: Dessert
- Place of origin: Laos, Thailand
- Region or state: Laos, Thailand
- Associated cuisine: Thailand, Laos, Cambodia, Philippines, Indonesia, Vietnam
- Main ingredients: Sticky rice, banana leaves, coconut milk
- Variations: Khao tom mat sai kluai, Khao tom mat sai mu, Khao tom mat sai phueak

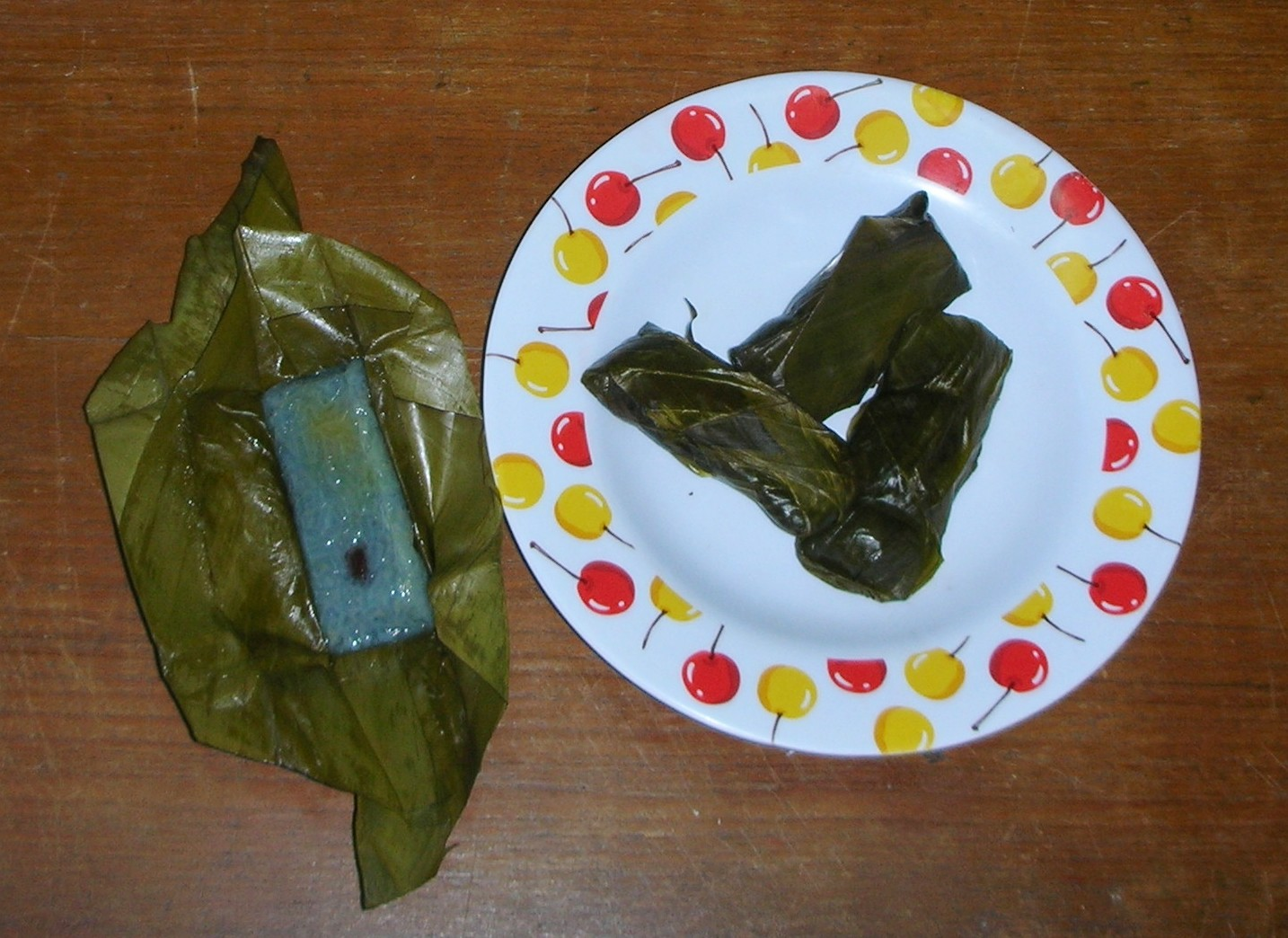
Thai khao tom is sometimes colored blue with Clitoria ternatea flowers

Khao tom (Lao: ເຂົ້າຕົ້ມ, pronounced [kʰȁ(ː)w.tôm]) and khao tom mat (Thai: ข้าวต้มมัด, pronounced [kʰâ(ː)w.tôm mát]) are a popular Laotian and Thai dessert made of sticky rice, ripe banana, coconut milk, all wrapped and steamed-cooked in banana leaves. A similar dessert is enjoyed throughout Southeast Asian countries where it is known as num ansom in Khmer, lepet in Indonesian, suman in Filipino, and bánh tét and bánh chưng in Vietnamese.

== Variants ==
This dessert can be either savoury (filled with pork fat and mung bean) or sweet (filled with coconut milk and banana). In Thailand, Khao tom mat is sometimes colored blue with Clitoria ternatea flowers. Typically Khao tom mat have black beans and Thai banana as the main ingredients. The Khao tom and Khao tom mat various flavors by the ingredients used inside i.e. taro, banana, pork, etc., brought each name to Khao tom mat; Khao tom mat sai pheuak (taro), Khao tom mat sai kluai (banana), Khao tom mat sai mu (pork).

== Traditions ==
In Laos, sticky rice is a national staple food and steeped in the Lao culture and religious traditions. Lao people use sticky rice to prepare khao tom for ceremonies connected with the plantings, rainfall, harvest and death. Khao tom is offered during the Lao baci ceremony held to commemorate special occasions, such as starting a new job, marriage, housewarming, birth of a new baby, and celebration of Lao New Year. Khao tom is prepared for alms giving to monks during the annual religious events in buddhist temples. Furthermore, khao tom is a popular snack sold during festivals, in markets and food stalls around the country. It was listed in a collection of recipes for favorite dishes of the former Lao royal family written by Phia Sing (1898-1967), the king's personal chef and master of ceremonies.

In Thailand, the Sai Krachat tradition (ประเพณีใส่กระจาด), also known as Suea Krachat or Soe Krachat in Phuan language, is a merit-making Buddhist tradition of the Thai Phuan people of Ban Mi District, Lopburi Province. It takes place on the eve of the Great Birth Sermon celebration. One day prior to the Sai Krachat Day, people wrap khao tom and grind rice for khao pun rice noodles. The next day is the Sai Krachat Day when people bring things such as bananas, sugar cane, oranges, candles, and joss sticks or other items to put into bamboo baskets at the houses of the people they know, while the hosts bring prepared food to welcome their guests. When the visitors wish to go home, the hosts give khao tom mat as a souvenir, called Khuen Krachat.

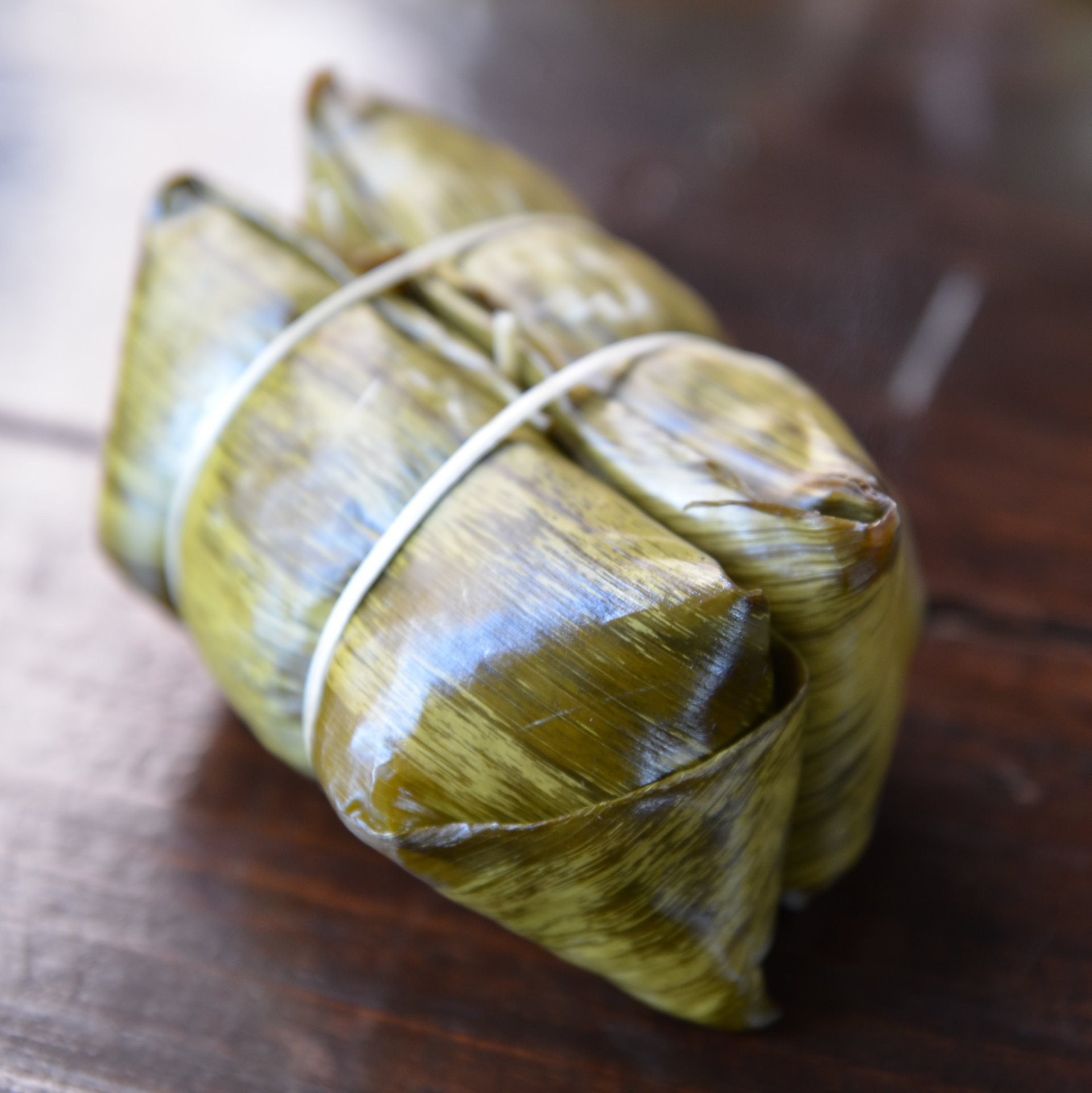
Khao tom mat packed as a pair

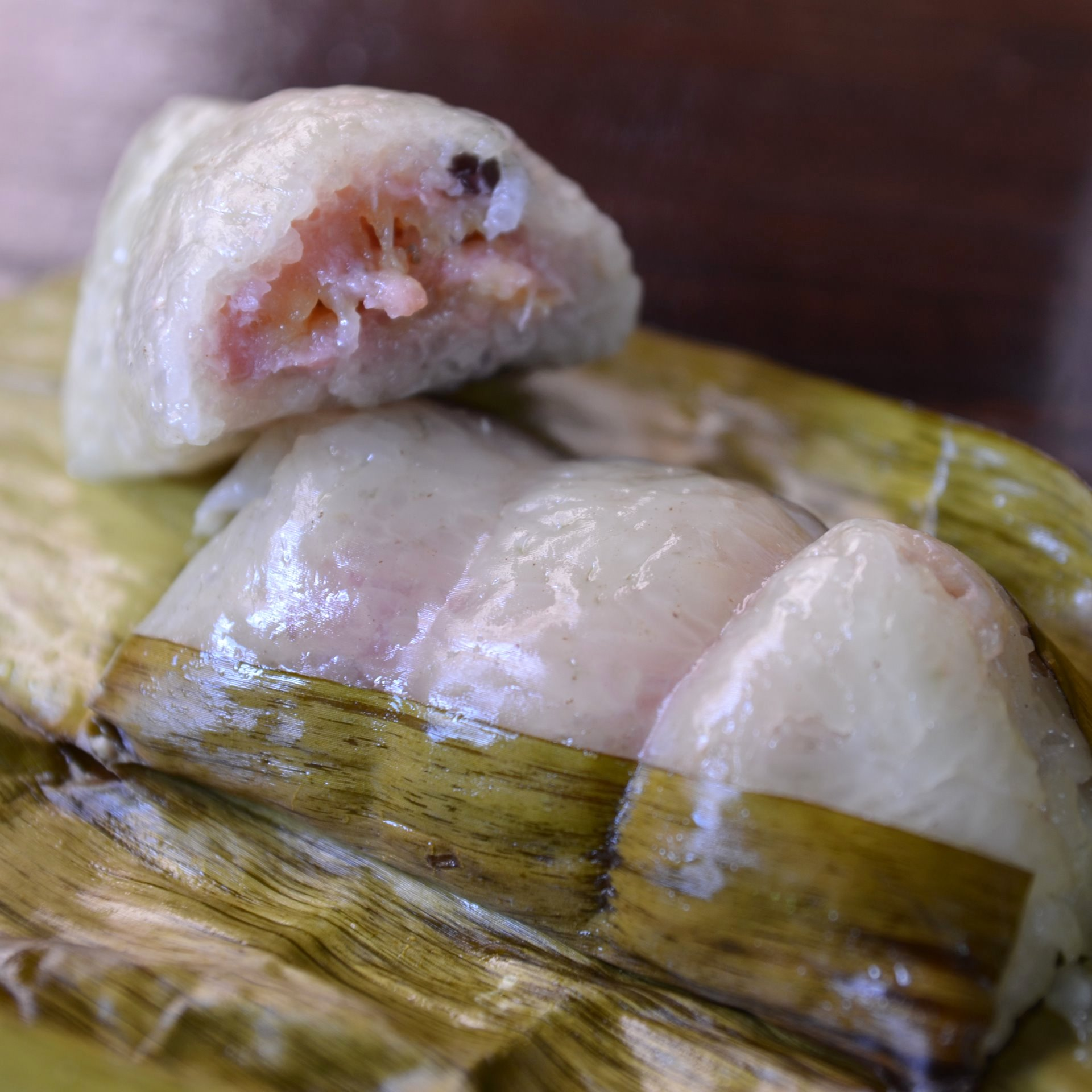
Khao tom mat showing the filling

In Thailand, khao tom mat is the symbol of couples because for boiling usually the leaf wraps are bundled to sets of two. Thai people believe that if a pair of people offer khao tom mat to monks on Khao Phansa Day, which is at the beginning of the 3 months of Buddhist lent during the rainy season and the time when monks retreat to a monastery and concentrate on Buddhist teachings, married life will be smooth and love will be stable.

Khao tom mat is also a traditional Thai dessert for Ok Phansa Day (the end of Buddhist lent in late October.), but it is then called khao tom luk yon (Thai: ข้าวต้มลูกโยน). This variant is wrapped up in a young mangrove fan palm leaf (Thai: ใบกะพ้อ) with long-tails to hold before tossing them to a Buddha image, after which monks can carry them away.

In 2014, the Department of Cultural Promotion under the Ministry of Culture registered khao tom mat as an intangible cultural heritage, in the Knowledge and Practices Concerning Nature and the Universe category, to prevent them from being lost along with other cultural heritage.

== See also ==
- Htamanè
- Glutinous rice
- Mango sticky rice
- Khao lam
- List of Thai desserts

== Bibliography ==
- Ramsay, Gordon (12 May 2011). Gordon's Great Escape Southeast Asia: 100 of my favourite Southeast Asian recipes. ISBN 9780007384525.
- "เมนูขนมไทย-ขนมหวาน | Wiparat Food - Part 5" (in Thai). Wiparat Food. Archived from the original on 2012-03-24.
