= Num kom =

Cambodian steamed rice cake

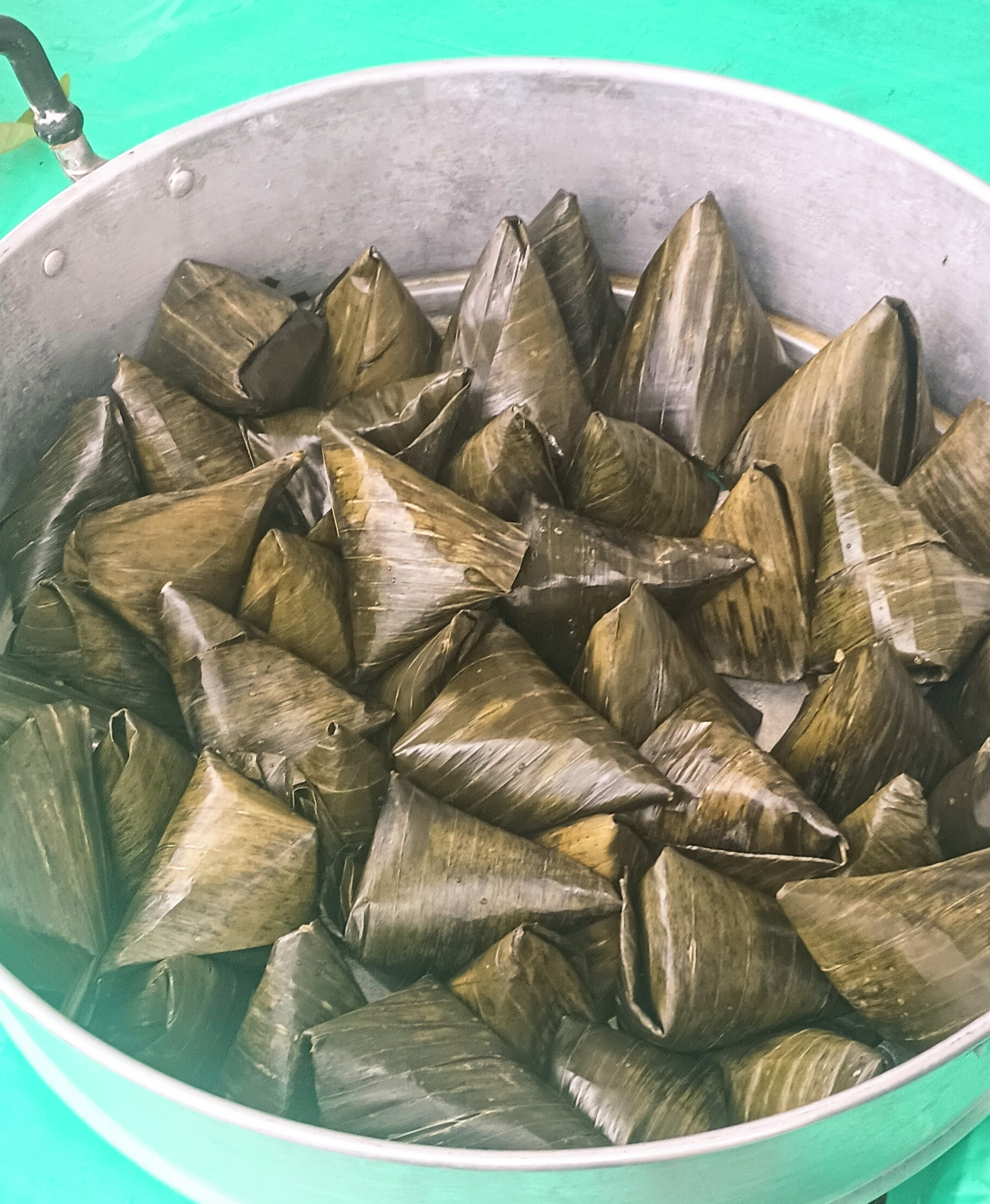
- Num kom steamed in banana leaves.
- Alternative names: num khom, nom kom, num korm, nom korm
- Type: rice cake
- Place of origin: Cambodia
- Region or state: Southeast Asia
- Associated cuisine: Cambodian cuisine
- Main ingredients: glutinous rice flour, grated coconut, palm sugar, and toasted sesame seeds

Num kom (Khmer: នំគម) is a traditional Cambodian steamed rice cake made from glutinous rice flour, filled with a mixture of grated coconut, palm sugar, and toasted sesame seeds distinctively wrapped in banana leaves in a pyramid shape.

== History and symbolism ==
Unwrapped num kom

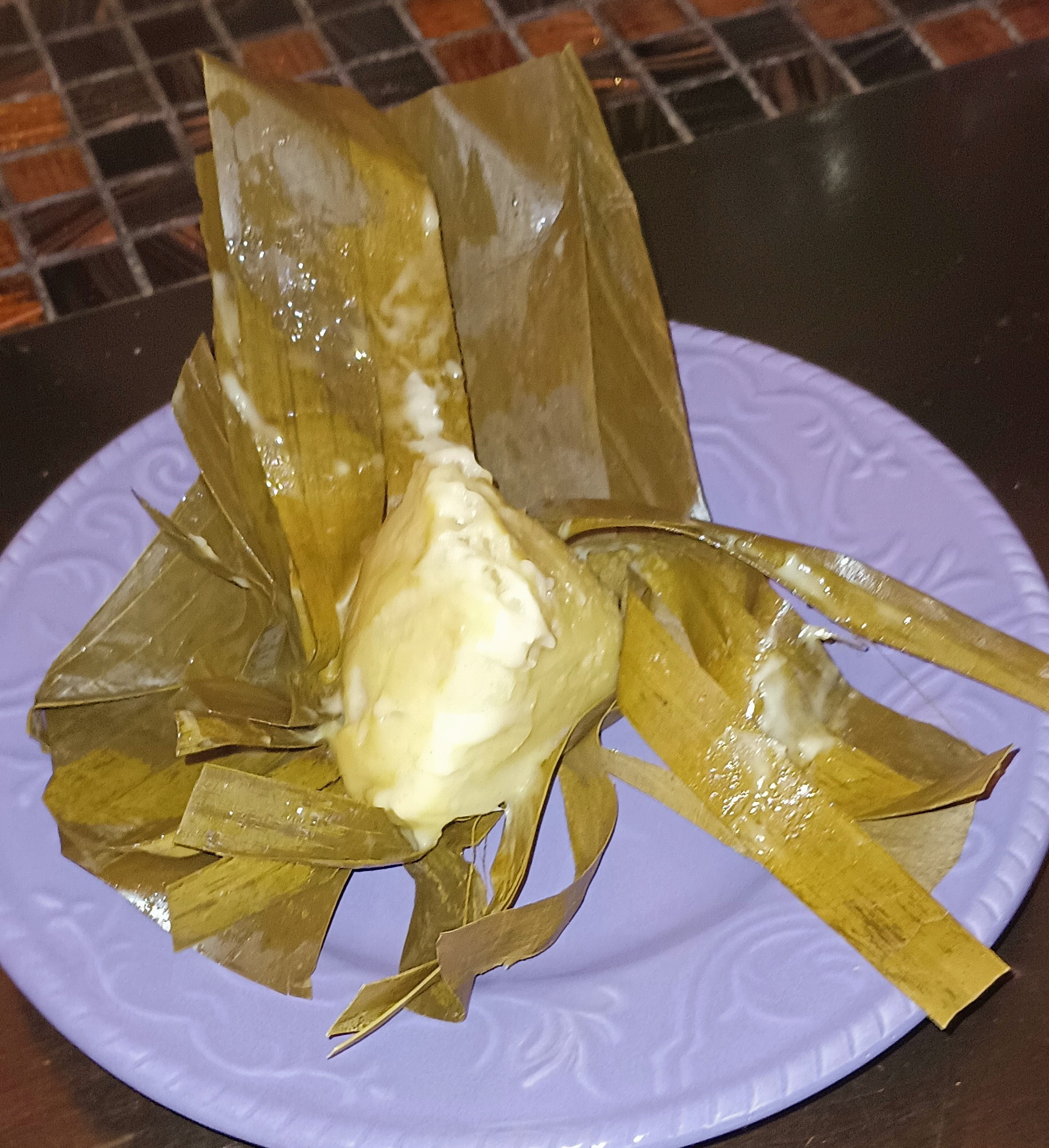
Chewy rice cake.

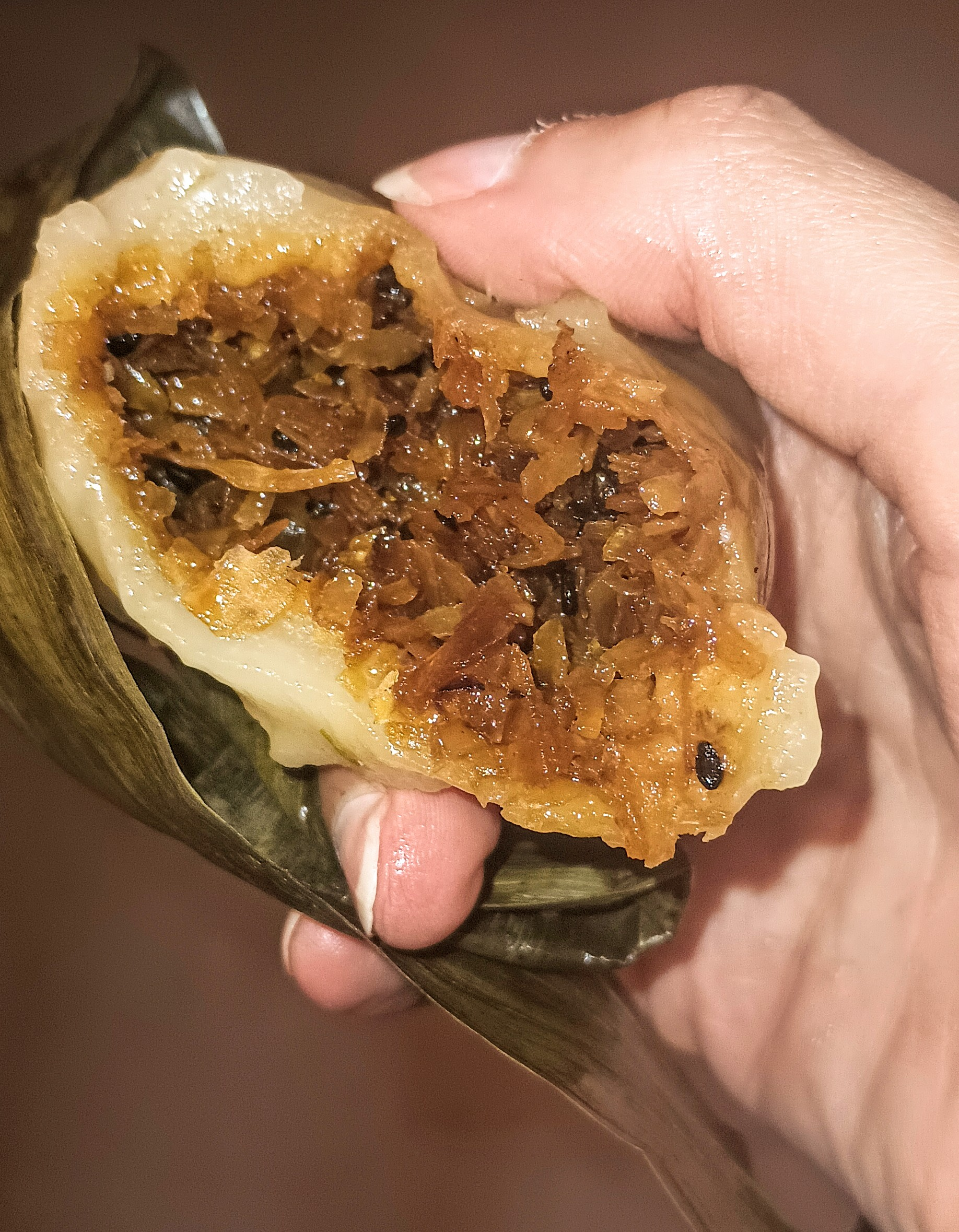
Sweet filling.

Along with num ansom, it is one of the most significant traditional cakes in Cambodia, traditionally prepared during major festivals such as Pchum Ben (Ancestors' Day), Khmer New Year, and weddings. The Royal Academy of Cambodia notes that the presence of the cake in traditional ceremonies dates back to the ancient period, with some documents linking its use to the reign of King Jayavarman VII.

For Khmers, num kom, along with num ansom, bear a “special spiritual, and sexual, significance."

Historian Sambo Manara explains how num kom are a tangible, edible symbol of Uma’s yoni, or vagina, which Khmers may be coy about discussing. This is the counterpart to num ansom, symbolizing Shiva’s linga, or phallus/penis. It also symbolizes respect for one’s mother and father, known as mea ba, and a practice with origins in first-century Brahmanical beliefs. The yoni further symbolizes “mothers, women, and water.” Architectural representations of yoni and linga that permeated Khmer temples died out along with the construction of stone temples in the 15th century, but the practice in rice-based desserts continued.
