= Ly line =

Dynasty of kings in present-day Vietnam, 1712–1632 BCE

Ly line Sixth dynasty of Hùng kings 支離 Chi Ly
- 1712 – 1632 B.C.
- Capital: Phong Châu
- Government: Monarchy
- Hùng king
  - 1712 BC–: Hùng Huy vương(雄暉王) Pháp Hải Lang
- Historical era: Hồng Bàng period
  - End of the Tốn line: 1712 B.C.
  - Beginning of the Khôn line: 1632 B.C.
Preceded by	Succeeded by
Tốn line	Khôn line

The Ly line (Vietnamese: chi Ly; chữ Hán: 支離; chi can also be translated to as branch) was the sixth dynasty of Hùng kings of the Hồng Bàng period of Văn Lang (now Viet Nam). Starting 1712 B.C., the line refers to the rule of Pháp Hải Lang and his successors, when the seat of government was centered at Phú Thọ.

== History ==
Pháp Hải Lang (Note: Another name is "Long Tiên Lang".) was born approximately 1740 B.C., and took the regnal name of Hùng Huy Vương (Note: Another spelling for the name is "Hùng Hồn Vương".) upon becoming Hùng king. The series of all Hùng kings following Pháp Hải Lang took that same regnal name of Hùng Huy Vương to rule over Văn Lang until approximately 1632 B.C.

This dynasty, as well as the next dynasty (Khôn line), sought to protect and consolidate Văn Lang's northern borders.

A new dawn of Vietnamese civilization during the Bronze Age in the Red River delta emerged approximately 1700 B.C. with the appearance of the new elaborate set of burial customs. During early time, a deceased person was usually buried with many pieces of pottery, axes, chisels and utensils such as vases and bowls.

During this period, the process of making silk is said to have become known to the Vietnamese. According to legend, the princess Thiều Hoa promoted the rise of silk textile industry.

This period is also best known as the time the Xích Tỵ made their appearance in northern Văn Lang. The outlines of the traditional account of the "invasion" by the Xích Tỵ is preserved in the Giỗ pagoda in Đông Anh District. The army, under the commanding generals Vũ Dực and Vũ Minh, became the salvation of Văn Lang and would eventually lead the war of liberation that drove the Xích Tỵ back into East Asia. Vũ Dực and Vũ Minh completed the conquest and expulsion of the Xích Tỵ from the northern border, restoring stability.

Some other notable military campaigns were under the leadership of Hùng Sơn, Vũ Hồng and Vũ Thị Lê Hoa.

The last Hùng king of this line gave his throne to Prince Lang Liêu because of Lang Liêu's best cook for his offerings to the king of bánh chưng and bánh giầy. Lang Liêu founded the 7th dynasty.

== Bibliography ==
- Nguyễn Khắc Thuần (2008). Thế thứ các triều vua Việt Nam. Giáo Dục Publisher.
