= Tốn line =

Fifth dynasty of Hung kings of the Hồng Bàng period

Tốn line Fifth dynasty of Hùng kings 支巽 Chi Tốn
- 1912 – 1713 B.C.
- Capital: Phong Châu
- Government: Monarchy
- Hùng king
  - 1912 BC–: Hùng Hi vương(雄犧王) Viên Lang
- Historical era: Hồng Bàng period
  - End of the Chấn line: 1912 B.C.
  - Beginning of the Ly line: 1713 B.C.
Preceded by	Succeeded by
Chấn line	Ly line

The Tốn line (Vietnamese: chi Tốn; chữ Hán: 支巽; chi can also be translated to as branch) was the fifth dynasty of Hùng kings of the Hồng Bàng period of Văn Lang (now Viet Nam). Starting 1912 B.C., the line refers to the rule of Viên Lang and his successors, when the seat of government was centered at Phú Thọ.

== History ==
Viên Lang (Note: Another name is "Bảo Lang".) was born approximately 1970 B.C., and took the regnal name of Hùng Hy Vương (雄牺王) upon becoming Hùng king. The series of all Hùng kings following Viên Lang took that same regnal name of Hùng Hy Vương to rule over Văn Lang until approximately 1713 B.C.

== Bibliography ==
- Nguyễn Khắc Thuần (2008). Thế thứ các triều vua Việt Nam. Giáo Dục Publisher.
