= Bánh chưng =

Vietnamese rice cake

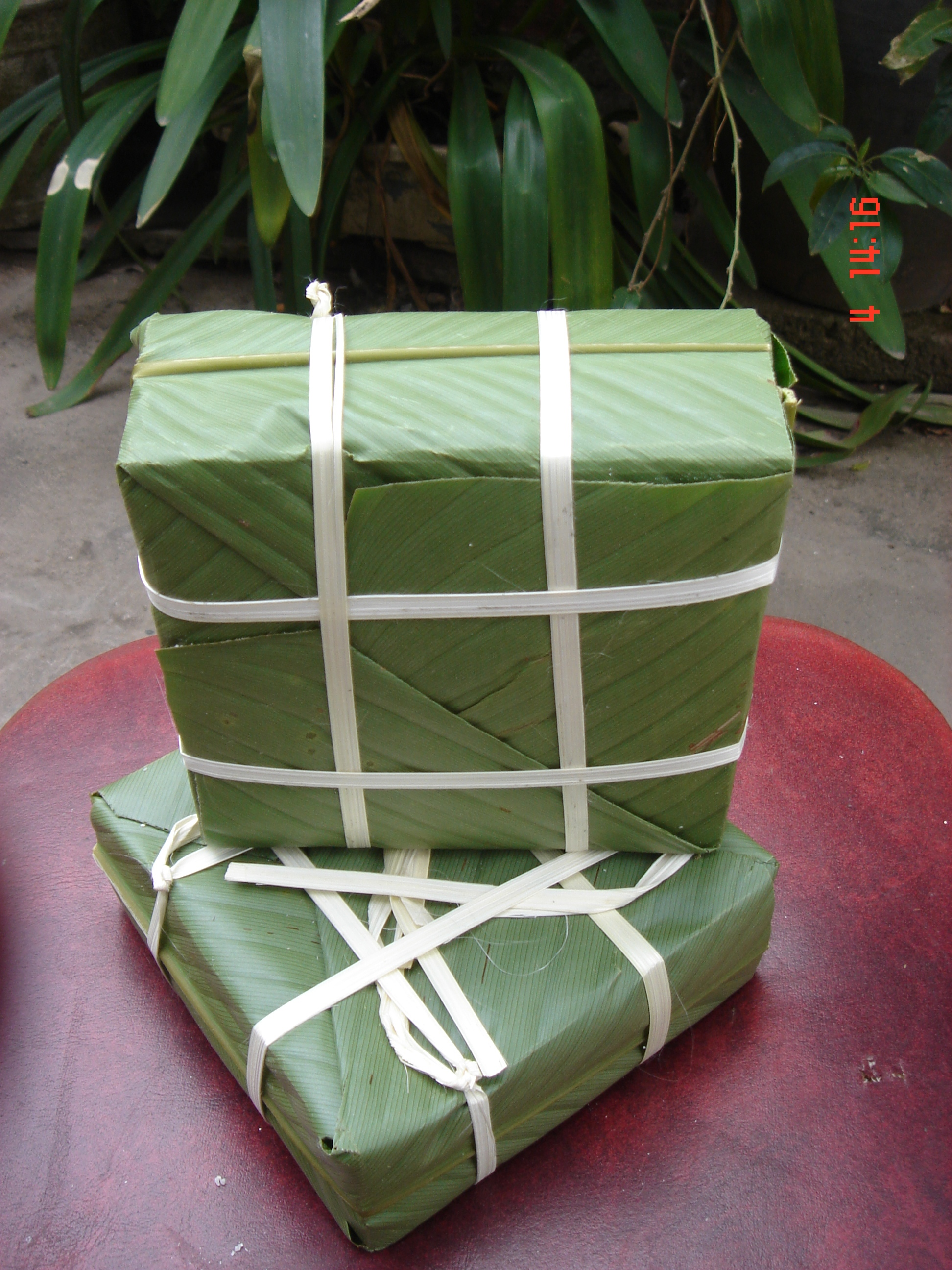
- A pair of bánh chưng wrapped in lá dong ready to be steamed
- Course: Main course
- Place of origin: Vietnam
- Region or state: Regions of Vietnam
- Serving temperature: Hot, room temperature, fried
- Main ingredients: Glutinous rice, mung bean, pork
- Other information: Traditionally consumed during Tết

Bánh chưng, banh chung or chung cake is a traditional Vietnamese dish which is made from glutinous rice, mung beans, pork, and other ingredients.

According to legend, its origin traces back to Lang Liêu, a prince of the last king of the Sixth Hùng Dynasty. He earned his place as successor by creating bánh chưng and bánh giầy, which symbolize the earth and the sky, respectively.

Considered an essential element of the family altar on the occasion of Tết, the preparation and consumption of bánh chưng are cherished traditions deeply rooted in Vietnamese culture. While closely associated with Tết, bánh chưng is enjoyed year-round as a staple of Vietnamese cuisine.

== Origin and symbolism ==
According to the book Lĩnh Nam chích quái (Extraordinary stories of Lĩnh Nam) published in the 14th century, the creation of bánh chưng was credited to Lang Liêu, a prince of the last Sixth Hùng Dynasty of the Hùng dynasty (c. 1712 – 1632 BC). It was said that in choosing a successor among his sons, the monarch decided to carry out a competition in which each prince brought a delicacy representing the sincerity of the ancestors on the occasion of Tết, whoever could introduce the most delicious dish for the altar would become the next ruler of the country. While other princes tried to find rare and delicious foods from the forest and sea, the eighteenth prince, Lang Liêu, who was the poorest son of the Hùng king, could not afford such luxurious dishes and had to be content with everyday ingredients, such as rice and pork. He created one cake in the square form of earth called bánh chưng and one in the round form of sky called bánh giầy from these simple ingredients. In tasting the dishes offered by his son, the Hùng king found bánh chưng and bánh giầy not only delicious but also a fine representation of the respect for ancestors. Therefore, he decided to cede the throne to Lang Liêu and bánh chưng, bánh giầy became traditional foods during Tết. Lang Liêu founded the Seventh Hùng dynasty (c. 1631 – 1432 BC).

Considered an indispensable dish of Tết, bánh chưng is placed on the family altars to honor the family ancestors and pray to them for support in the new year. Wrapped in a green square package, bánh chưng symbolizes the earth, the various ingredients of bánh chưng, which come from all the products of nature, also emphasize the meaning of bánh chưng with Vietnamese people.

== Ingredients and presentation ==
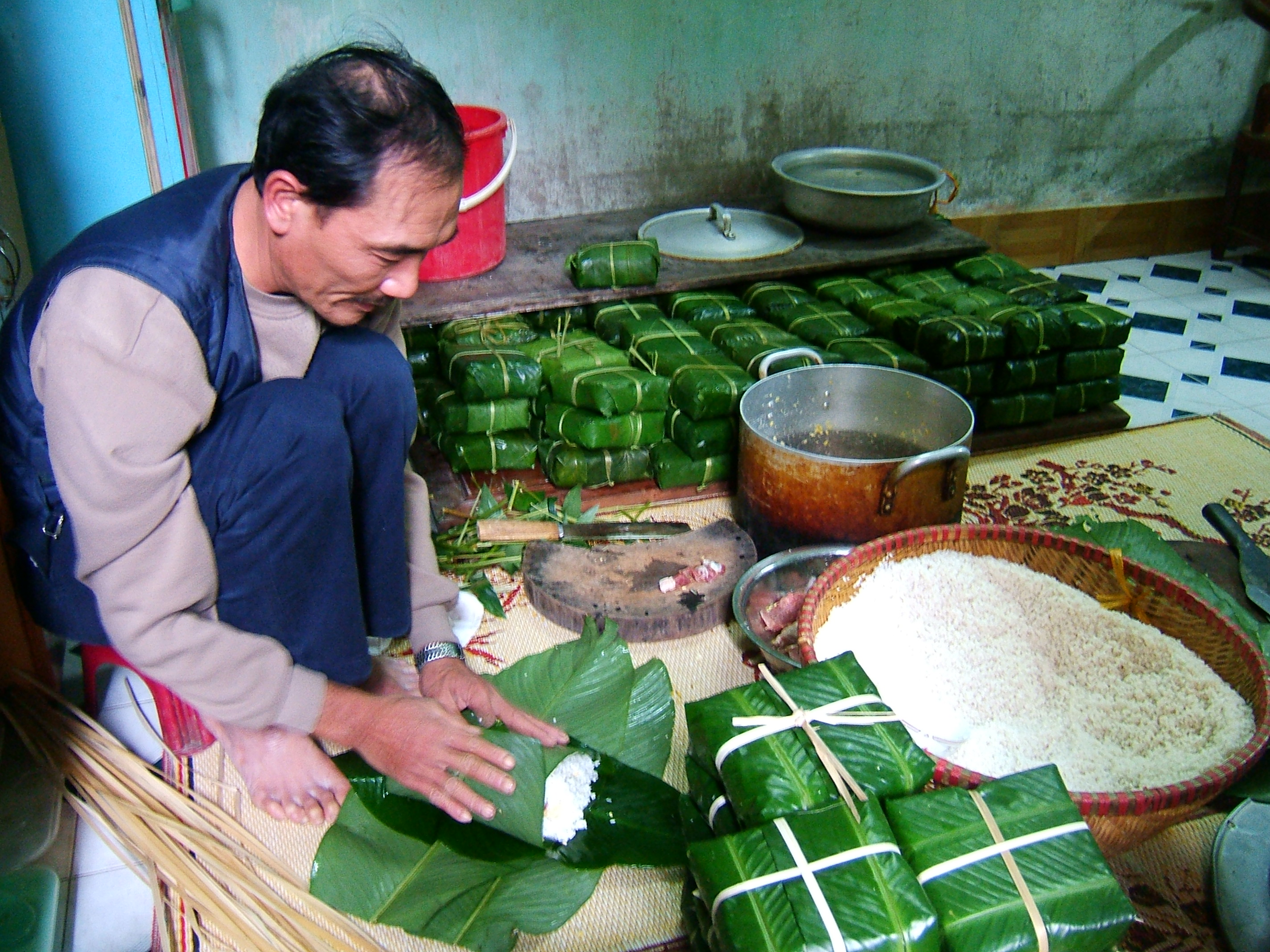
Wrapping bánh chưng without mold

The required ingredients of bánh chưng are glutinous rice, mung bean, fatty pork and black pepper, salt, sometimes green onion, and nước mắm for salty taste. In the wrapping stage, one needs lá dong, strings split from giang (Maclurochloa sp.), one type of bamboo which has long node, and sometimes a square mold in wood so that bánh chưng can be wrapped in a better shape, lá dong, which is popular only in Southern Asia, can be substituted by banana leaves or even lá bàng. Lá dong and giang strings have to be washed carefully in order to preserve the taste of the cake, giang strings may be soaked in water or steamed so that they become flexible enough for wrapping and tying. People often choose high-quality rice and beans for making bánh chưng. The mung beans are soaked in water for approximately 2 hours and the glutinous rice for 12 to 14 hours. The mung beans are drained, cooked and mashed into a paste. The fat in the pork is preferred for bánh chưng because its fatty flavor associates well with the glutinous rice and mung beans. After being sliced in approx. half-inch thick strips, the pork is mixed with pepper, onion, salt and nước mắm. Sugar can also be added to this mixture of spices.

The cake is wrapped in the following order. First, the giang strings and two lá dong leaves are placed as the square base for the bánh chưng. Then glutinous rice is stuffed in lá dong, followed by mung bean, pork, more mung bean and finally another layer of rice so that bean and pork can be respectively in the center of the cake. The ingredients are carefully wrapped in lá dong and bound by giang strings in the square form. In order to get a near-perfect square-shaped cake, the maker can use a square mold to help in the wrapping and pressing the ingredients to fill the corners of the square mold. To keep the cake from mold or being spoiled, bánh chưng should be wrapped as tight as possible.

The prepared cakes are arranged in a large pot (with recommended spacing between cakes, using chopsticks, bamboo or other spacers). The pot is filled with fresh water and boiled for hours until they are cooked thoroughly. As the water evaporates during cooking, more boiled water should be added to keep the cakes submerged at all time. The outer-most layer of rice turns green because the rice absorbed the color of lá dong. One bánh chưng is often divided into eight (triangular shaped) or nine (square shaped) pieces, usually by using the very giang string that bounded the cake. As the cake was formed from several ingredients, the taste of bánh chưng varies from part to part with different flavors of glutinous rice, pork, bean and even the wrapping lá dong. Bánh chưng is often served with pickled onions or vegetables, chả lụa and nước mắm. After unwrapping, bánh chưng remains edible for several days when stored in the refrigerator, while an unopened one can be kept for up to two weeks in the refrigerator. Bánh chưng can also be frozen and thawed again for consumption, though the quality is not as good as a fresh cake. Bánh chưng has the water activity value a_{w} of about 0.95 and its pH is approximately 6.4.

Bánh chưng examples

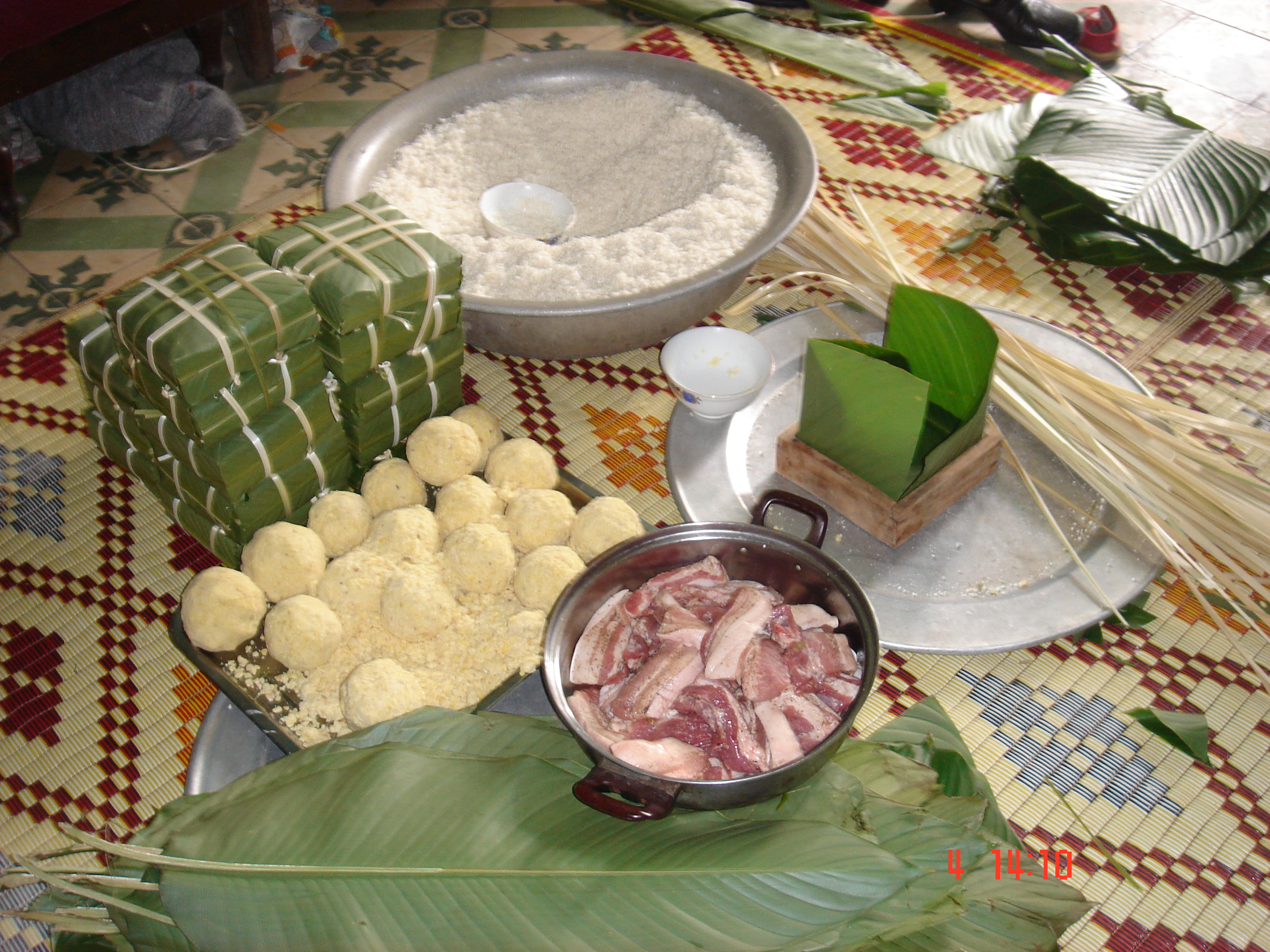
The prepared ingredients of bánh chưng

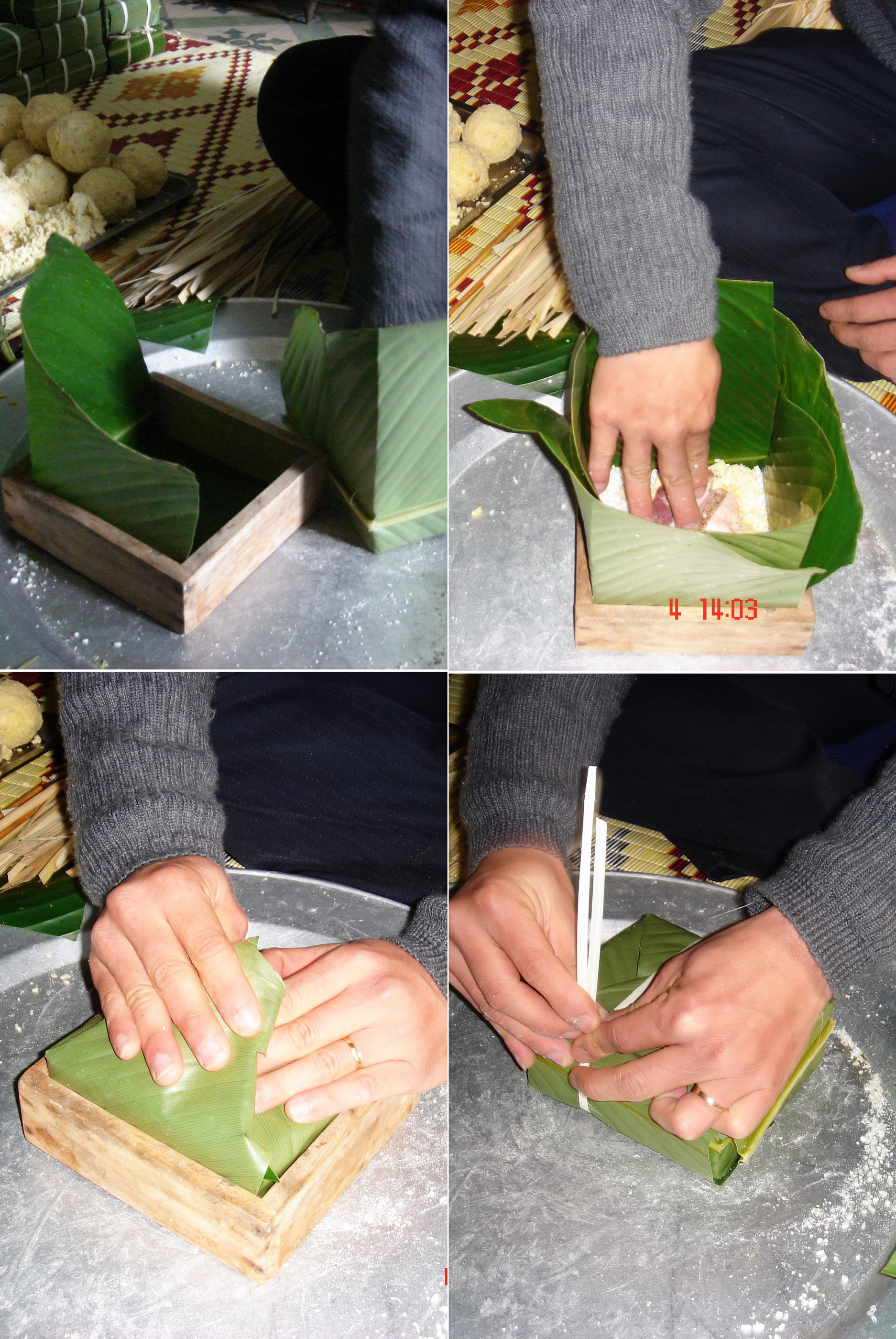
Wrapping bánh chưng using a mould

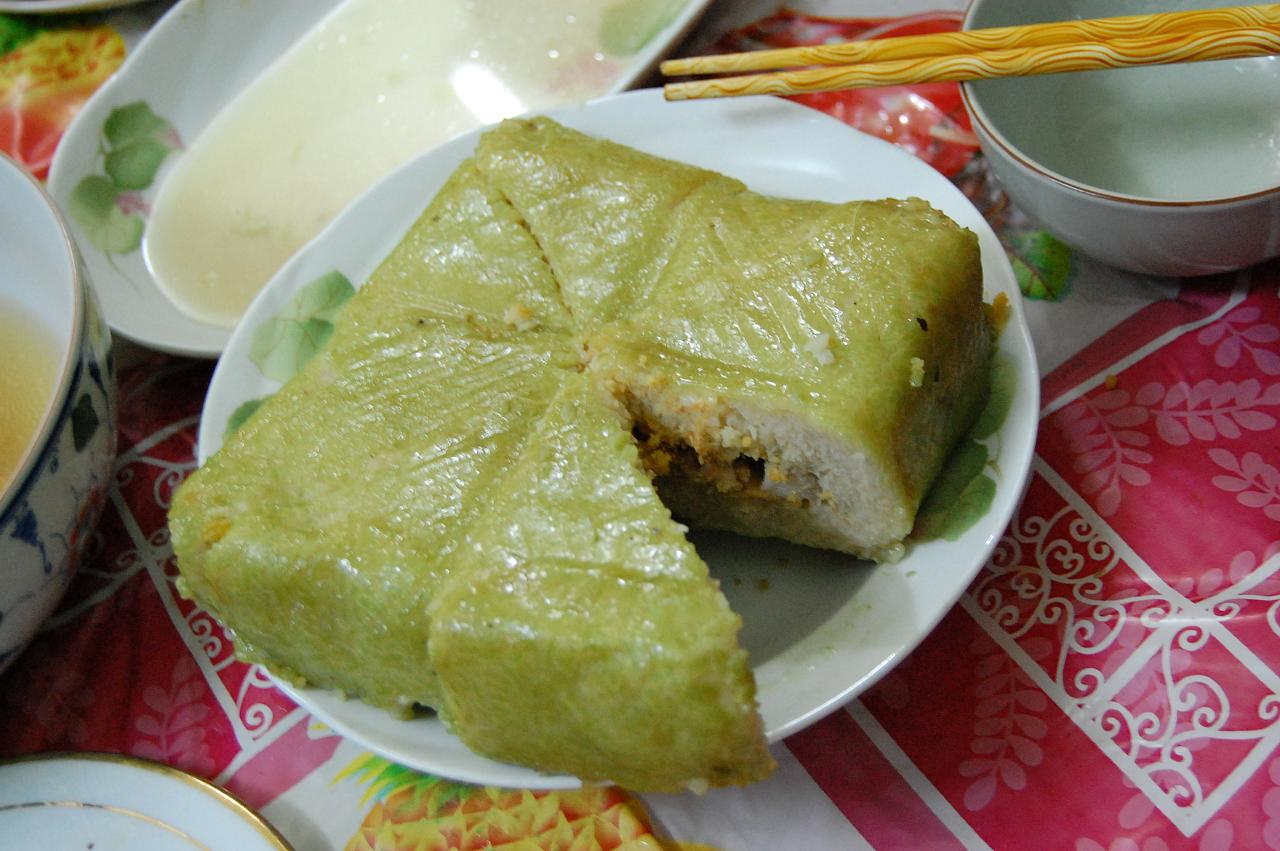
An unwrapped bánh chưng, cut into eight pieces, ready to serve

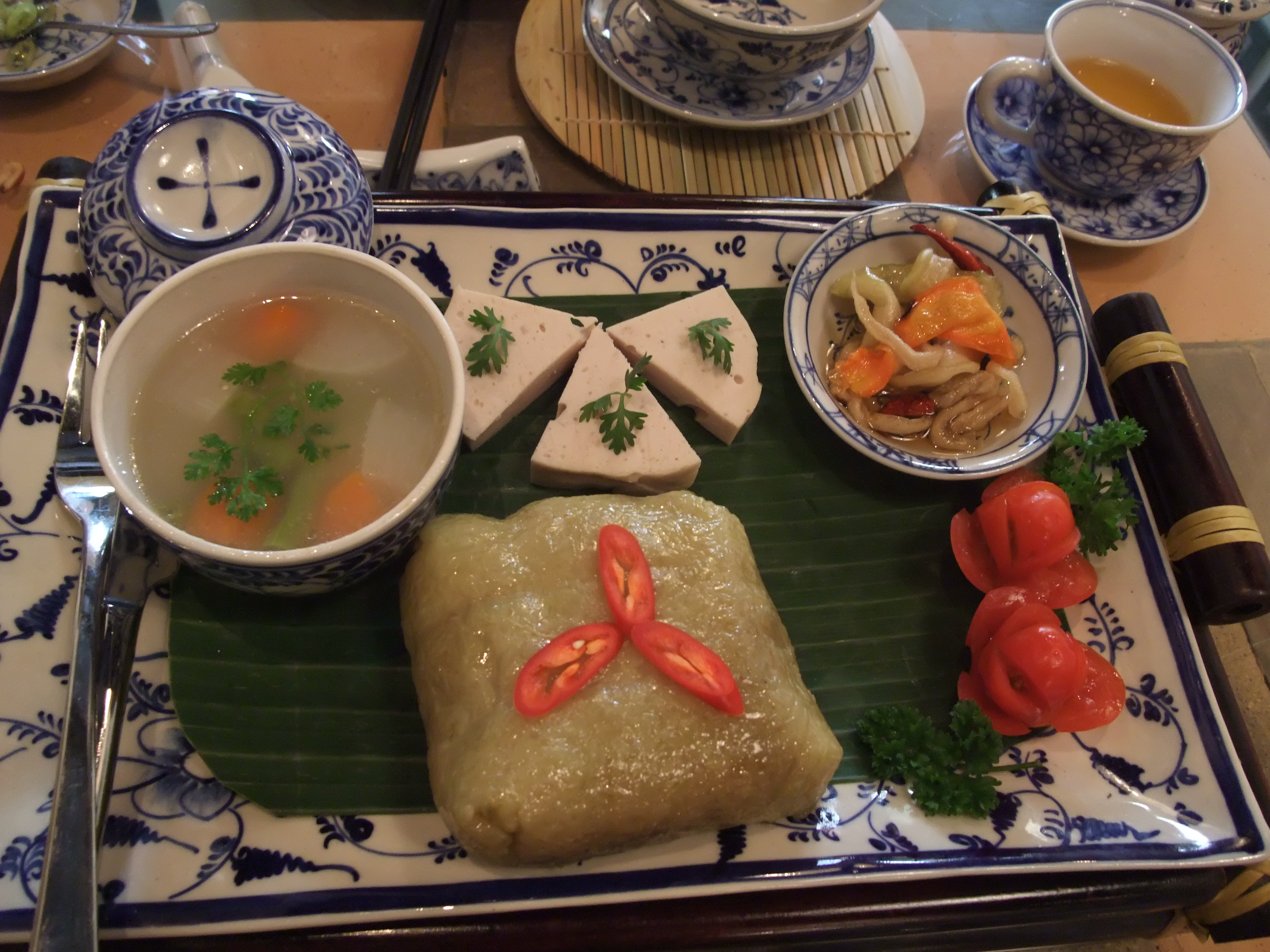
Bánh chưng is served with chả lụa and other dishes

== History and tradition ==
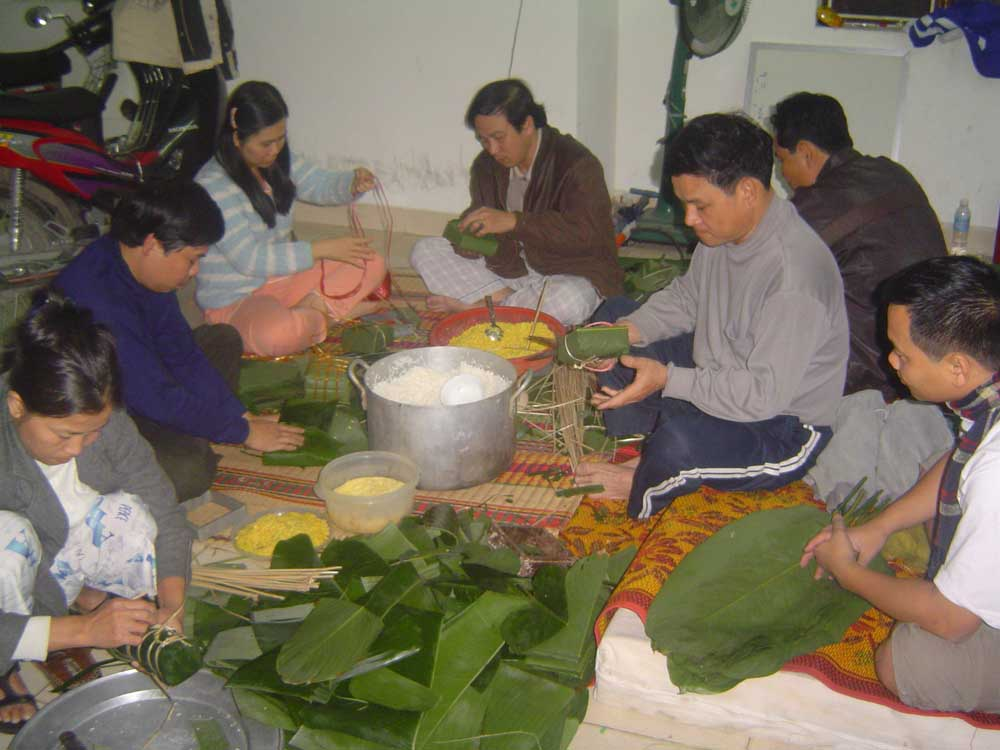
A Vietnamese family wrapping bánh chưng

Bánh chưng is always considered an essential element of a traditional Tết, which is described by a popular couplet:

Vietnamese: Thịt mỡ, dưa hành, câu đối đỏ
Cây nêu, tràng pháo, bánh chưng xanh
Translation: Rich meats, pickled onions, red couplets
Nêu tree, firecracker, green bánh chưng

Women wear áo dài for their tradition. Traditionally, bánh chưng requires the preparation of many ingredients, each Vietnamese family that can afford such a preparation begins to make the cake on the 27th or 28th day of the twelfth month of the Vietnamese calendar (tháng Chạp). In making bánh chưng, all members of the family gather to perform different tasks, from washing the lá dong, mixing the pork with spices, preparing the mung beans and most importantly wrapping all ingredients into the square form and boiling the cakes. Bánh chưng needs to be carefully boiled for ten to twelve hours during which the adults and children sit together around the boiling cauldron. In the countryside, to ensure that bánh chưng is available for every family even the poor ones, a fund called họ bánh chưng is jointly set up and about one month before the Tết, the accumulated capital and benefit are divided between members of the fund so that they can have enough money to prepare bánh chưng.

Nowadays, the tradition of self-made bánh chưng gradually declines in Vietnam when the size of a typical family is smaller and people do not have enough time for the preparation and making of bánh chưng. Instead, they go to the bánh chưng shop or order cakes in advance from families that specialize in making them. Therefore, bánh chưng still appears in each family during the Tết but they are not a family product anymore. With the shift of bánh chưng making from family to specialized manufacturers, some craft villages became famous for their reputation in making bánh chưng such as Tranh Khúc village or Duyên Hà village both in Thanh Trì, Hanoi.

Each year, on the occasion of the Death anniversary of the Hung Kings, a competition of making bánh chưng and bánh dày is often organized in Hùng Temple, Phú Thọ. Participants from eight different regions including Lào Cai, Hanoi and Cần Thơ are provided with 5 kg of glutinous rice, bean, 1 kg of pork so that they can make 10 bánh chưng in 10 minutes, the product of the winning team will be present in the official altar of the festival. In 2005, bánh chưng makers in Ho Chi Minh City offered Hùng Temple a pair of giant bánh chưng and bánh giầy, the size of the bánh chưng measured 1.8m x 1.8m x 0.7m (71 x 71 x 27.5 inches) and weighed 2 tonnes after cooking, it was made in Ho Chi Minh City and subsequently transferred to Phú Thọ.

== Variations ==
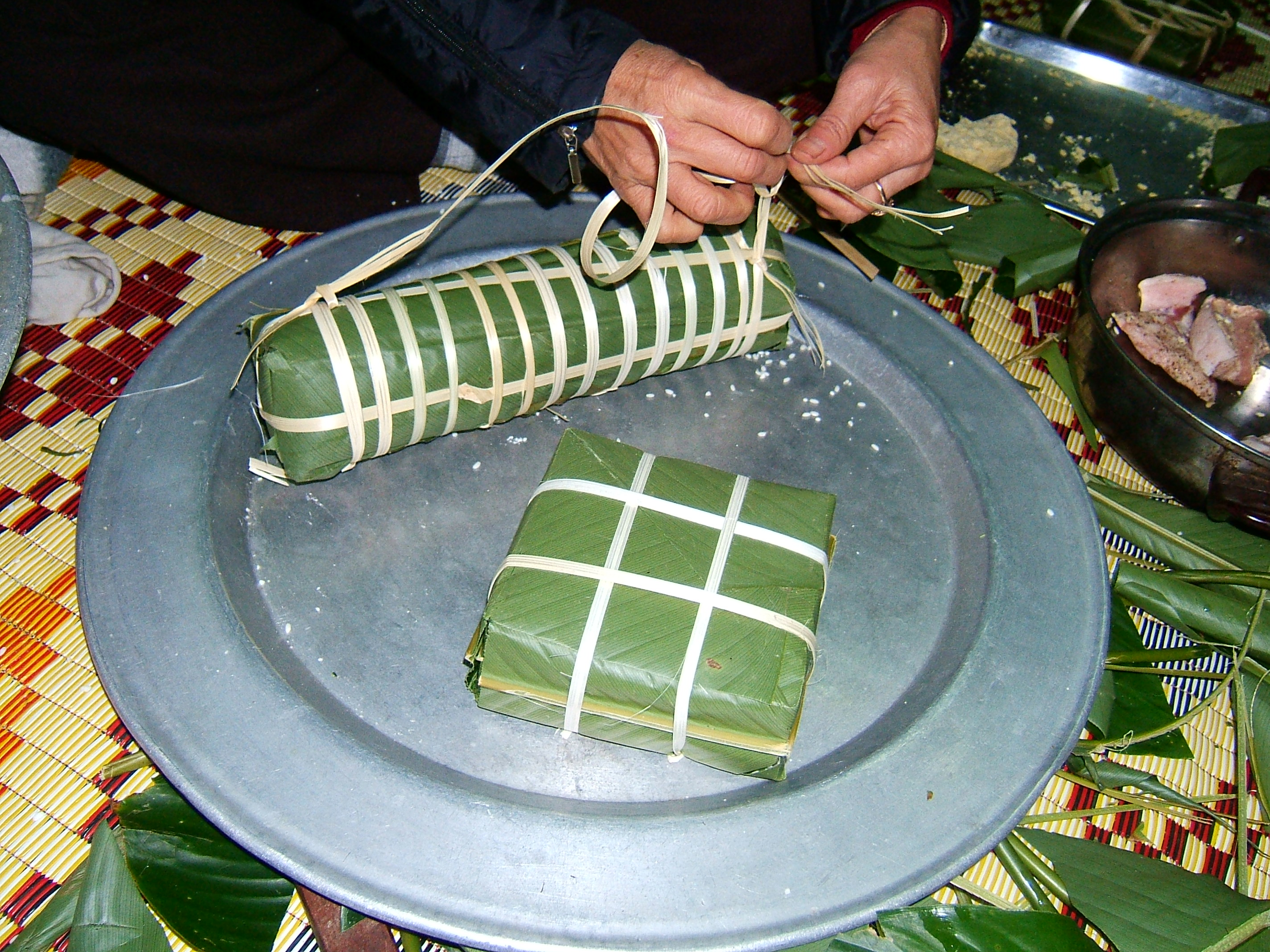
Bánh chưng (square) in comparison with bánh tày (cylindrical)

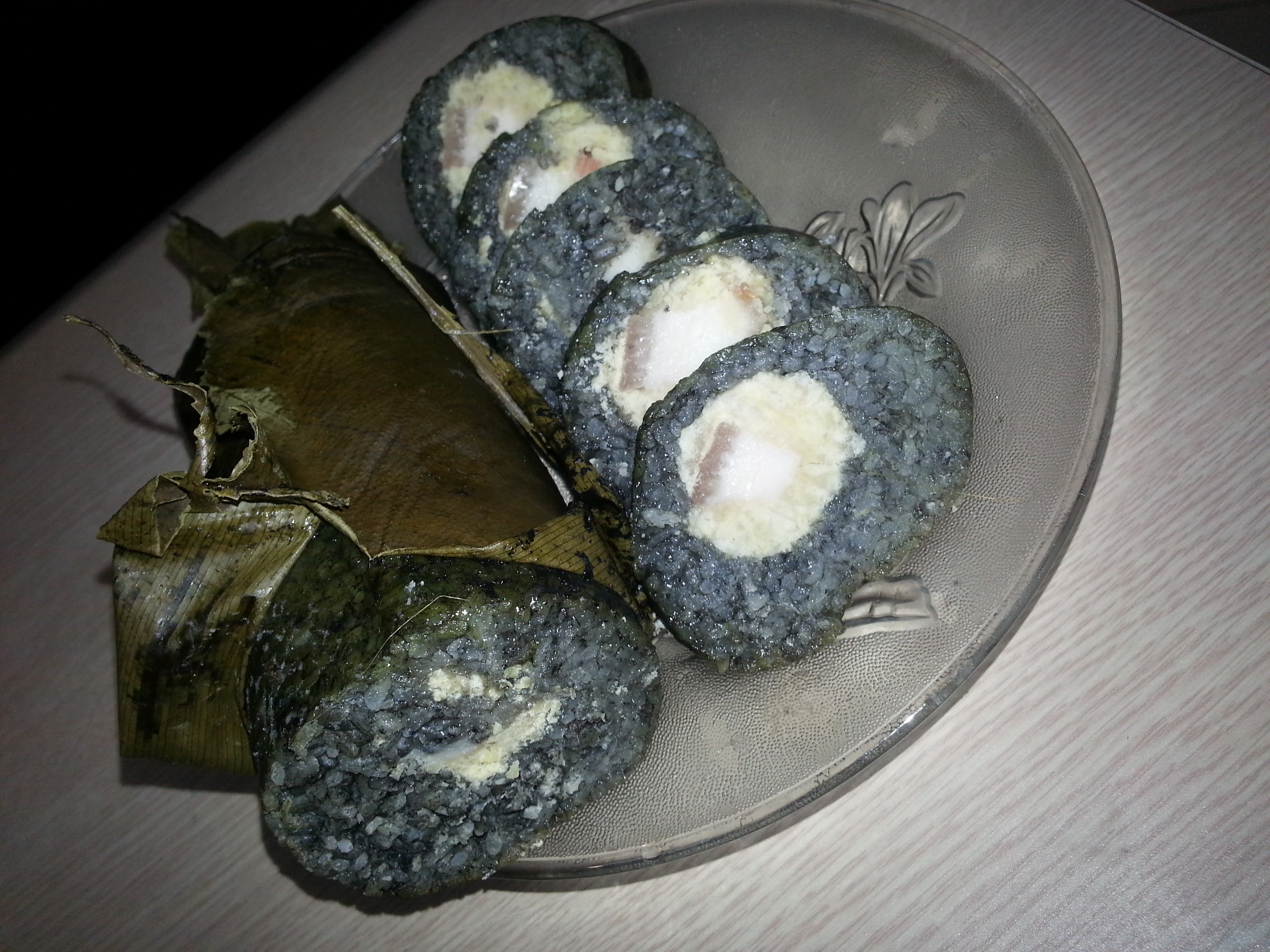
Black bánh chưng is a variant of the Yao people's bánh chưng.

While being normally eaten warm or at room temperature, bánh chưng also be fried up and served in the form of a crisp pancake. It is then called bánh chưng rán or bánh chưng chiên (fried bánh chưng). Writer Vũ Bằng in his book Thương nhớ mười hai (Longing of the 12 months) mentions bánh chưng rán as a delicious dish during the cold winter of Hanoi.

In some regions, instead of bánh chưng, people make bánh tét: a cylindrical cake with almost the same ingredients as bánh chưng. A similar cake as bánh tét is made in some regions in the North but with the name bánh tày, bánh chưng dài (long bánh chưng) or bánh dài. Bánh tày is often made with a small quantity of mung bean and little or no pork, so that it can be preserved for a longer period. Bánh tày can be cut in slices and fried like bánh chưng rán.

The San Diu people has another variation of the long bánh chưng with a hump in the middle of the cake – hence it is called bánh chưng "gù" ("humped" bánh chưng). Besides lá dong, bánh chưng "gù" is wrapped with an additional type of leaf named lá chít.

There are also variations of bánh chưng for vegetarians and Buddhists, such as bánh chưng chay (vegetarian chưng cake) or bánh chưng ngọt (sweetened chưng cake). Instead of being stuffed with pork these cakes are filled with molasses or brown sugar. In these variations sometimes the glutinous rice is mixed with gac, giving the cake a red skin considered more appetizing. In the countryside bánh chưng chay was once made by the poor families who could not afford pork for stuffing. They replaced pork with cardamom, black pepper and cooked mung bean. This type of bánh chưng was eaten with molasses.

== See also ==
- Bánh tẻ
- List of rice dishes
- List of steamed foods
- List of stuffed dishes
- Lo mai gai
- Pamonha
- Tamale
- Zongzi
