= Chapssal-tteok =

Korean rice cake variety

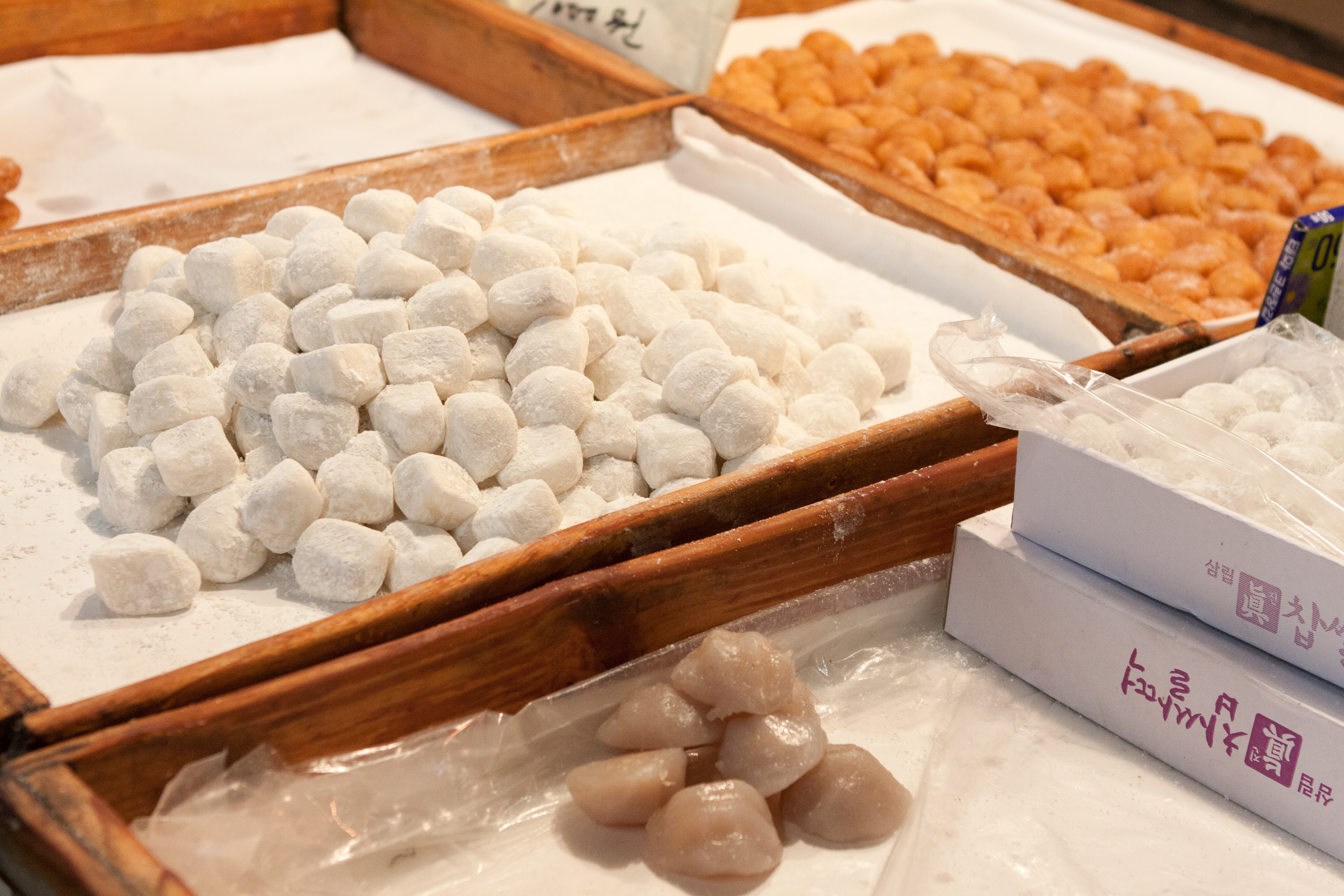
- Alternative names: Chaltteok, glutinous rice cake
- Type: Tteok
- Place of origin: Korea
- Associated cuisine: Korean cuisine
- Main ingredients: Glutinous rice
- Similar dishes: Mochi, bánh giầy

- Chapssal-tteok
- Hangul: 찹쌀떡
- RR: chapssaltteok
- MR: ch'apssalttŏk
- IPA: [tɕʰap̚.s͈al.t͈ʌk̚]

Alternate name
- Hangul: 찰떡
- RR: chaltteok
- MR: ch'alttŏk
- IPA: [tɕʰal.t͈ʌk̚]

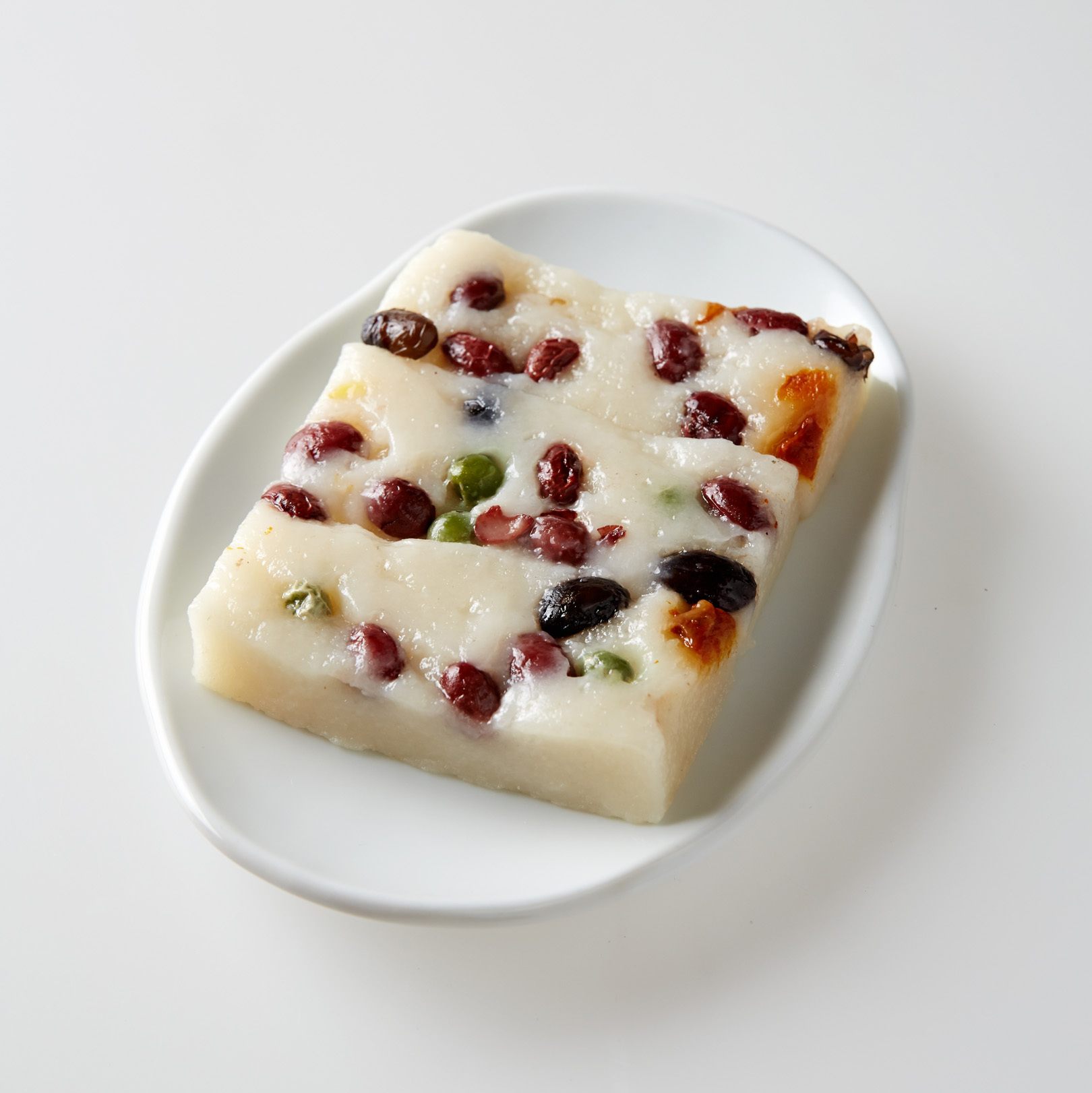
Chaltteok

Chapssal-tteok (찹쌀떡; [tɕʰap̚.s͈al.t͈ʌk̚]), also called chaltteok (찰떡, [tɕʰal.t͈ʌk̚]), is a tteok, or Korean rice cake, made of glutinous rice.

Chapssal-tteok is traditionally provided as a good luck gift to students before exams. Its sticky texture symbolizes the answers "sticking" in students' minds.

== Etymology ==
Chapssal-tteok is a compound noun consisting of chapssal (찹쌀), meaning "glutinous rice," and tteok (떡), meaning "rice cake."

The word chapssal is derived from the Middle Korean chɑl (ᄎᆞᆯ), meaning "glutinous," and psɑl (ᄡᆞᆯ), meaning "rice." Chɑlpsɑl (ᄎᆞᆯᄡᆞᆯ) appears in Gugeup ganibang, a 1489 book on medicine. The word became chɑppsɑl (ᄎᆞᆸᄡᆞᆯ) with consonant cluster reduction and then became chɑpsɑl (ᄎᆞᄡᆞᆯ) with degemination. Due to the loss of the vowel ɑ (ㆍ) as well as syllable-initial consonant clusters, the word became chapssal with the syllable boundary between coda p and onset ss. Tteok is derived from the Middle Korean sdeok (ᄯᅥᆨ), which appears in Worin seokbo, a 1459 biography and eulogy of the Buddha.

The word chaltteok is a compound consisting of the attributive adjective chal (찰), meaning "glutinous," and tteok. Chal is derived from the Middle Korean chɑl (ᄎᆞᆯ), and the word chɑlsdeok (ᄎᆞᆯᄯᅥᆨ) appears in Geumganggyeong Samga hae, a 1482 book on the Diamond Sūtra.

Accordingly, chaltteok can mean tteok made of glutinous grains other than rice, but chapssal-tteok can only refer to tteok that is made of glutinous rice. In most cases, however, the words are used interchangeably, as tteok is most often made with glutinous or non-glutinous rice.

== Preparation and varieties ==
Chapssal-tteok can be prepared in several ways. Glutinous rice is soaked, ground into flour, and then steamed in a siru (rice cake steamer). The rice may or may not then be pounded. Sometimes, the rice is ground after being steamed instead of before.

Chapssal-tteok can be coated with gomul (powdered sesame or beans) and steamed, or it may be boiled and then coated. Chapssal-tteok can also be made round and filled with various so (fillings) such as red bean paste.

Chapssal-tteok ice cream is popular in modern South Korea.

Chapssal-tteok is featured in some fusion Korean dishes.

== Similar food ==
Some Japanese mochi and Vietnamese bánh giầy varieties are very similar to certain chapssal-tteok varieties. Both may be made by steaming and pounding soaked glutinous rice.

== See also ==
- List of Korean desserts
