= Thai banana =

Banana cultivar

Thai banana (pisang awak) 粉蕉
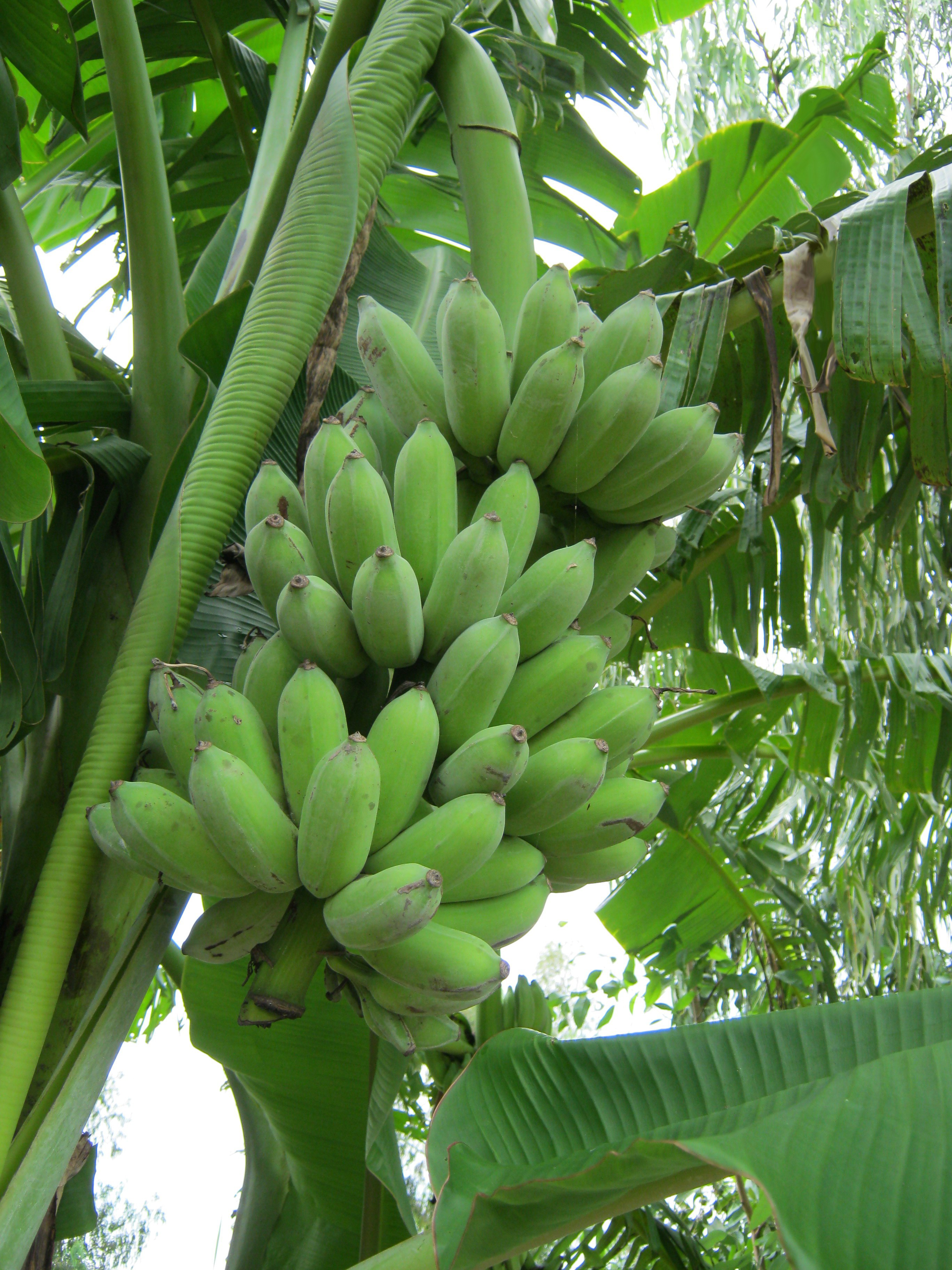
- Unripe Thai banana in An Giang province, Vietnam
- Hybrid parentage: Musa acuminata × Musa balbisiana
- Cultivar group: ABB Group
- Cultivar: Musa 'Pisang Awak'
- Origin: Thailand

Thai banana (also called pisang awak; Chinese: 粉蕉; pinyin: Fěn jiāo) is a banana cultivar originating from Thailand, belonging to the triploid ABB banana cultivar group.

In China, it is commonly known as fenjiao (粉蕉, literally "powder banana") and is widely grown in the southern provinces such as Guangdong, Guangxi, Hainan, Yunnan and Fujian.

== Etymology ==
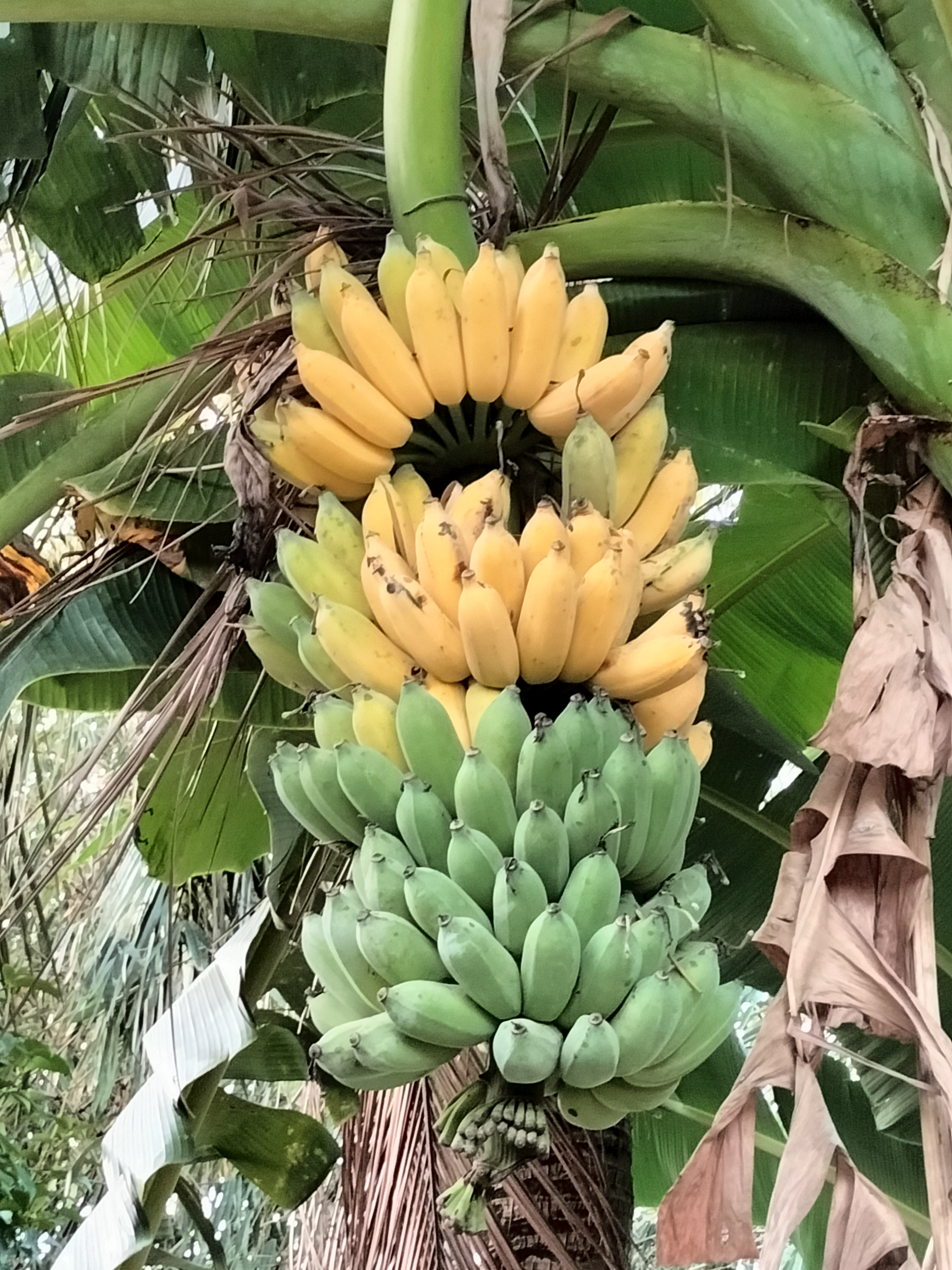
A bunch of Thai banana

Thai banana (or 'pisang awak') is also known in Australia as 'Ducasse' and 'Kayinja' in Uganda. The Malaysian name "pisang awak" is more commonly used among research institutions. In Thailand, it is known as kluai nam wa (กล้วยน้ำว้า, pronounced [klûaj nám wáː]). It is known in the Khmer-speaking Thai province of Surin as chek sâ (ចេកស) or white banana. This banana variety has multiple romanizations including 'Namwah Tall' (with a superfluous 'h'). In Vietnam, it is called as chuối sứ or chuối xiêm ("Siamese banana", means 'Thailand banana'). In Philippines, it is commonly called lagkitan in the Southern Tagalog region or botolan in the Palawan region.

As a stout mutation, 'Dwarf Pisang Awak' is known in America as Musa 'Dwarf Namwah' as popularized by Agri-Starts Inc; and in Thai language as kluai nam wa khom (กล้วยน้ำว้าค่อม).

== Description ==
Thai banana plant grows up to 3–5 m (9.8–16.4 ft) in height. It is known to produce seed with the availability of fertile pollen.

== Taxonomy ==
Thai banana is originated from Thailand, a cross between Musa acuminata and Musa balbisiana. Most sources affirm that Thai banana belongs to the triploid ABB genome group. Its official designation is Musa (ABB Group) 'Pisang Awak'. Synonyms include: Musa paradisiaca var. awak.

== Cultivars and mutants ==
Several improved cultivars and mutants of the Pisang Awak subgroup have been developed, particularly in China, through different breeding strategies.

'RF1' (Refen 1) is a semi-dwarf mutant derived from ethyl methanesulfonate (EMS) mutagenesis of a local ‘Fenjiao’ (ABB Pisang Awak) cultivar. Compared to the wild type, RF1 shows a 32% reduction in pseudostem height, improved cold tolerance, and enhanced resistance to Sigatoka disease, along with increased soluble sugar and starch accumulation and reduced cellulose deposition.

'Qingfen No.1' (青粉1号) is a superior variant selected from somaclonal variation of ‘Zhongfen No.1’ tissue culture plantlets. It features a yellow-green leaf sheath (vs. purple-red in the parent), tall stature (412.2 cm), high yield (average bunch weight 30.5 kg), excellent fruit quality (soluble solids 28.0%), and resistance to leaf spot, bunch top virus and black freckle disease, but is susceptible to Fusarium wilt race 1.

'Fenza No.1' (also known as ‘Fenza 1’, 粉杂1号) is a hybrid cultivar (ABBB genome) derived from crossing ‘Guangfen No.1’ (ABB) with a wild BB banana. It shows high resistance to Fusarium wilt tropical race 4 (TR4), good eating quality, and occupies a significant market share in China's specialty banana sector.

Physiological and molecular studies have also been conducted on the ripening of Pisang Awak bananas. Research on four major Fenjiao cultivars (‘Aifen No.1’, ‘Jinfen No.1’, ‘Guangfen No.1’, and ‘Fenza No.1’) showed that during postharvest ripening, peel hardness and pulp hardness decrease while pulp adhesiveness and compactness increase, with colour parameters $a^*$ (red-green) increasing and $h^o$ (hue angle) decreasing. ‘Fenza No.1’ exhibited the best overall texture among the four.

At the molecular level, a regulatory module involving MaSINAT5 (an E3 ubiquitin ligase), MaERF113 (an ethylene response factor), and MaABI5-like (an abscisic acid signaling transcription factor) controls starch and chlorophyll degradation during ‘Fenjiao’ banana ripening. MaSINAT5 ubiquitinates MaERF113 at the K78 residue, leading to its proteasomal degradation and thereby negatively regulating ripening, while ethylene and ABA synergistically induce MaERF113 and MaABI5-like expression.

== Uses ==
'Thai banana' is mainly eaten fresh when ripe, or used in desserts and local dishes. Its flesh resists browning, making it suitable for cooking and processing. The leaves and pseudostems are sometimes used as fodder or for wrapping food.

In Uganda, 'Thai banana' (known locally as kayinja) is grown for making banana beer.

In Cambodia, 'Thai banana' (chek nam va) is favored for its multiple uses. The banana blossoms and pseudostem, although astringent, are eaten as a vegetable. The folded leaves are used as containers for steamed curries such as fish amok and ansom chek.

In Vietnam, Thai bananas are eaten ripe or green. "Grilled sticky bananas" is prepared from Thai banana and was listed by CNN as one of "The World's Best Desserts".

In China, Pisang Awak (known as Fenjiao) has a long cultivation history in southern provinces. It is prized for its sweet taste, firm texture when cooked, and relatively stable market price. Unlike the dominant Cavendish banana (AAA genome) which accounts for about 80% of China's banana production, Fenjiao exhibits stronger abiotic stress resistance, making it suitable for subtropical regions with occasional cold spells.

== See also ==
- Banana
- List of banana cultivars
- Musa (genus)
- Musa acuminata
