= Chuối nếp nướng =

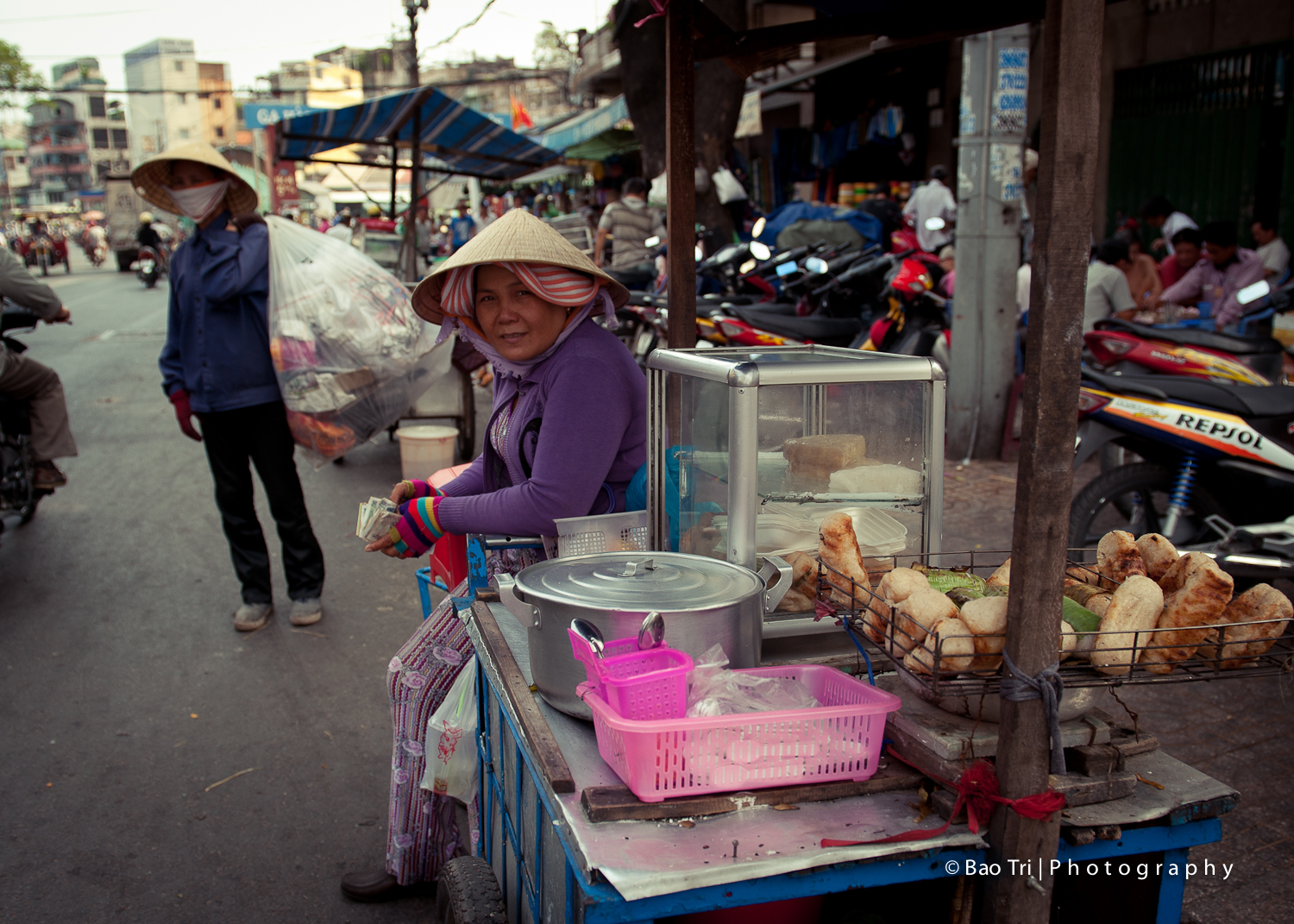
A food stand sells chuối nếp nướng in southern Vietnam.

Chuối nếp nướng, also known as grilled banana wrapped in sticky rice, is a popular street food in Vietnam, particularly in the southern region.

== History ==
Chuối nếp nướng is thought to have originated from southern province of Bến Tre, Vietnam; it quickly became the province's specialty and then spread to the south and all over Vietnam. Over time, the dish has evolved, with each vendor in each regions adding their own unique twists.

== Ingredients and Variations ==
The key element of chuối nếp nướng is the Thai banana. The dish is made by wrapping ripe bananas in a layer of glutinous rice, then wrapped in banana leaves and grilled over charcoal, giving the dish the name and also its distinctive aromatic smoky flavor. Then the dish can be eaten plain or served with a coconut milk-based sauce and pinch of crushed peanuts or grilled sesame seeds.

One of the key elements that sets chuối nếp nướng apart from other Vietnamese street foods is its versatility: the dish can be enjoyed as a sweet or savory snack, depending on the choice of fillings. Sweet versions typically feature only drizzle of coconut milk and a sprinkling of crushed peanuts/grilled sesame seeds, while savory options may additionally include small bobas, desiccated coconut, or scallions.

== In Vietnam culture ==
Today, chuối nếp nướng can be found at street food stalls and markets throughout Vietnam, as well as a representative cuisine of Vietnam at international food festivals such as World Street Food Congress in Singapore. In recent years, chuối nếp nướng has gained international recognition and has been featured in various international media outlets, including CNN's Culinary Journeys, which ranked it among the top nine most delicious desserts in the world.
