= Bánh giầy =

Vietnamese rice cake

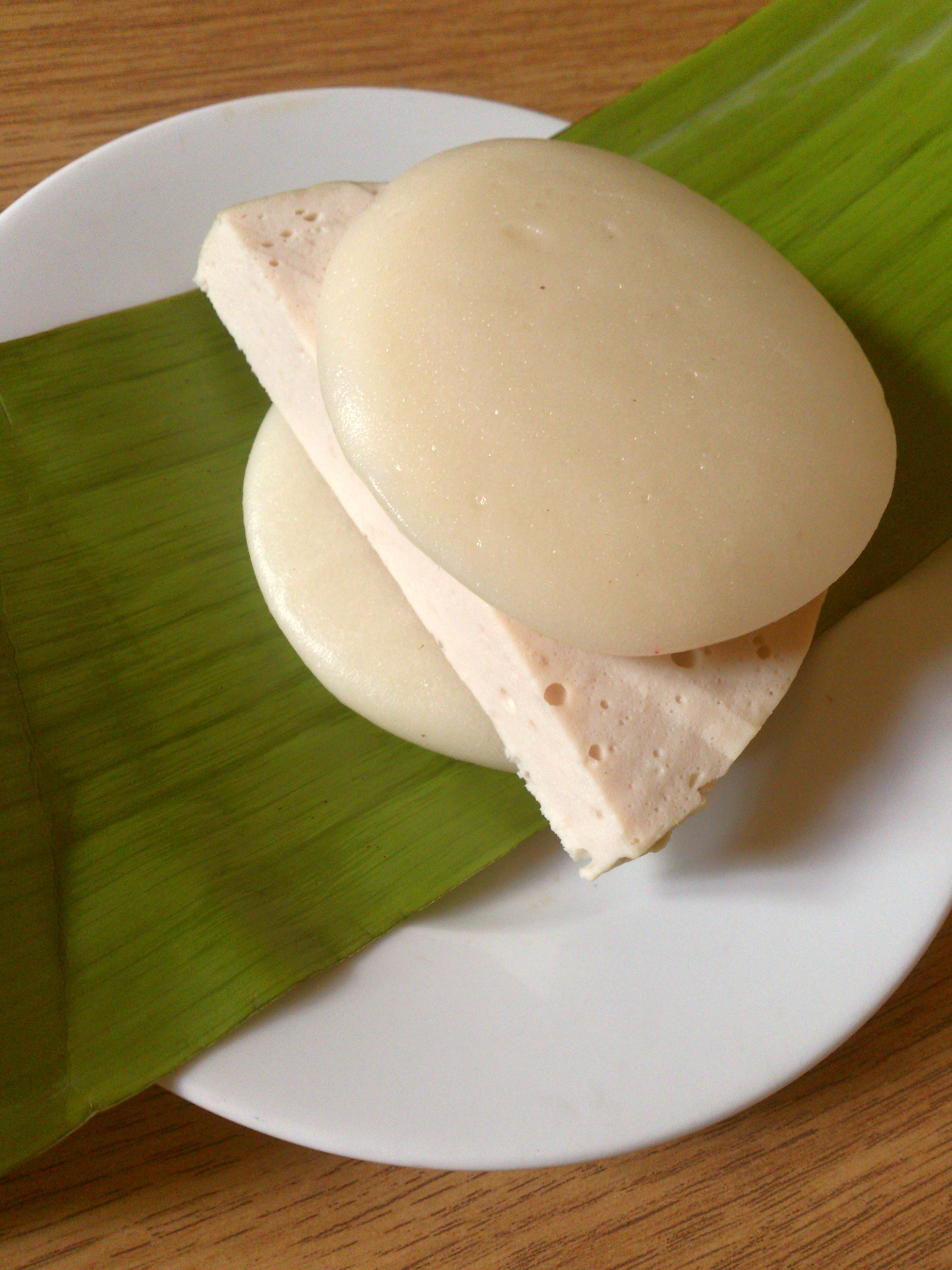
- Bánh giầy with giò
- Alternative names: Bánh dày
- Type: Rice cake
- Course: Traditional food
- Place of origin: Vietnam
- Region or state: Northern Vietnam
- Serving temperature: Room temperature
- Main ingredients: Glutinous rice

Bánh giầy (often mistaken as bánh dầy, bánh dày or bánh giày) is a Vietnamese traditional cake. Bánh giầy is a white, flat, and round glutinous rice cake. They are wrapped in cut pieces of banana leaves. They are usually served with a type of Vietnamese sausage giò lụa. Bánh giầy can be fried to a thin crispy golden crust or be eaten with giò lụa. Another variation is called bánh giầy đậu, where ground boiled mung bean (đậu xanh)—salted or sweetened—is stuffed inside. It is very similar to other Asian glutinous rice cakes like Japanese mochi, Korean tteok or Chinese lo mai chi and ciba (糍粑).

== Traditional story of Bánh Giầy ==
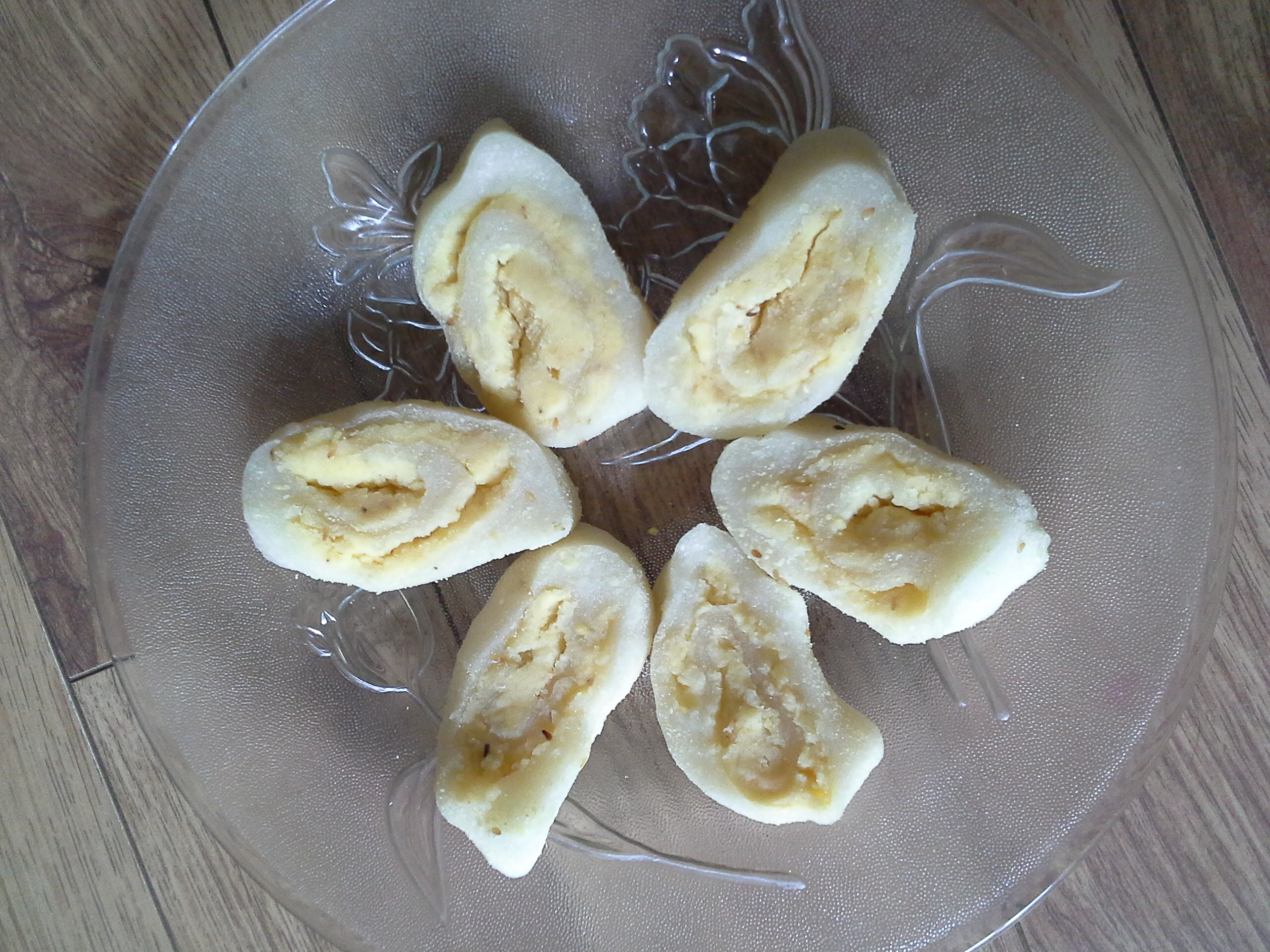
Bánh giầy đậu xanh

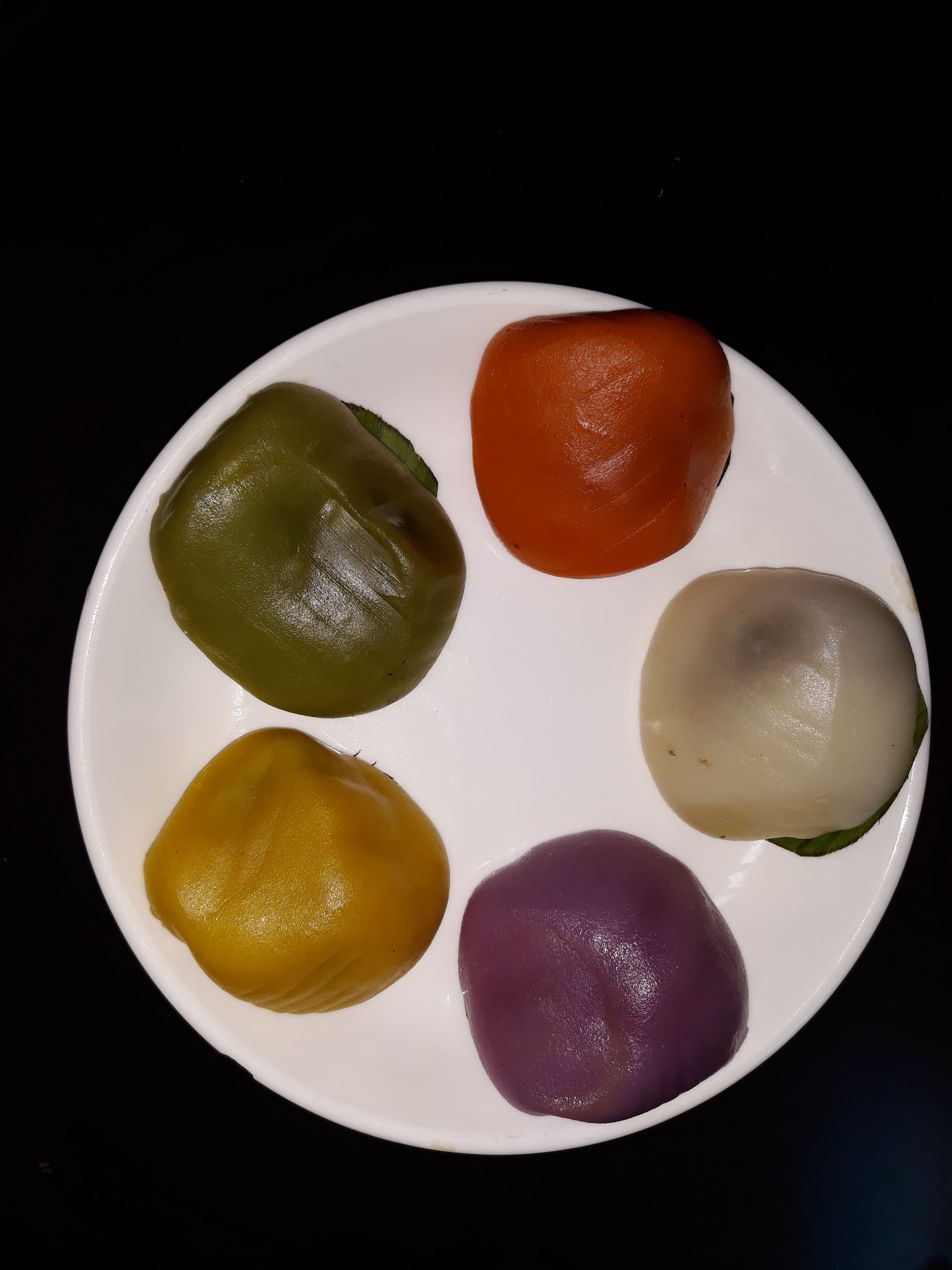
Bánh giầy ngũ sắc (five-color bánh giầy)

Emperor Hùng Huy Vương had many sons. Some pursued literary careers. Others excelled in martial arts. The youngest prince, named Lang Liêu, however, loved neither. Instead, he and his wife and their children chose the countryside where they farmed the land.

One day, toward the end of the year, the emperor met with all his sons. He told them whoever brought him the most special and unusual food would be made the new emperor. Almost immediately, the princes left for their homes and started looking for the most delicious food to offer the emperor. Some went hunting in the forests and brought home birds and animals which they prepared into the most palatable dishes. Some others sailed out to the open sea, trying to catch fish, lobsters and other much-loved sea food. Neither the rough sea nor the violent weather could stop them from looking for the best gifts to please the emperor.

In his search, Lang Liêu went back to the countryside. He saw that the rice in his paddy fields was ripe and ready to be harvested. Walking by a glutinous rice field, he picked some golden grains on a long stalk. He brought them close to his nose and he could smell a delicate aroma.

His entire family then set out to harvest the rice. Lang Liêu himself ground the glutinous rice grains into fine flour. His wife mixed it with water into a soft paste. His children helped by building a fire and wrapping the cakes with leaves. In no time, they finished, and in front of them lay two kinds of cakes: one was round and the other was square in shape.

The round cake was made with glutinous rice dough and was called bánh dầy by Lang Liêu. He named the square shaped cake bánh chưng which he made with rice, green beans wrapped in leaves.

On the first day of spring, the princes took the gifts of their labor and love to the emperor. One carried a dish of steamed fish and mushrooms. Another brought with him a roasted peacock and some lobsters.

When it was Lang Liêu's turn to present his gifts, he carried the bánh chưng and his wife carried the bánh dầy to the emperor. Seeing Lang Liêu's simple offerings, the other princes sneered at them. But after tasting all the food brought to court by his sons, the emperor decided that the first prize should be awarded to Lang Liêu.

The emperor then said that his youngest son's gifts were not only the purest, but also the most meaningful, because Lang Liêu had used nothing except rice which was the basic foodstuff of the people to make them. The emperor gave up the throne and made Lang Liêu the new emperor. All the other princes bowed to show respect and congratulated the new emperor.

== See also ==
- Mochi
- Chapssal-tteok
- Jian dui
- Kochi
- Nian gao
- Sapin sapin
- Tteok
