= Bánh tét =

Vietnamese cake made from glutinous rice

Bánh Tét
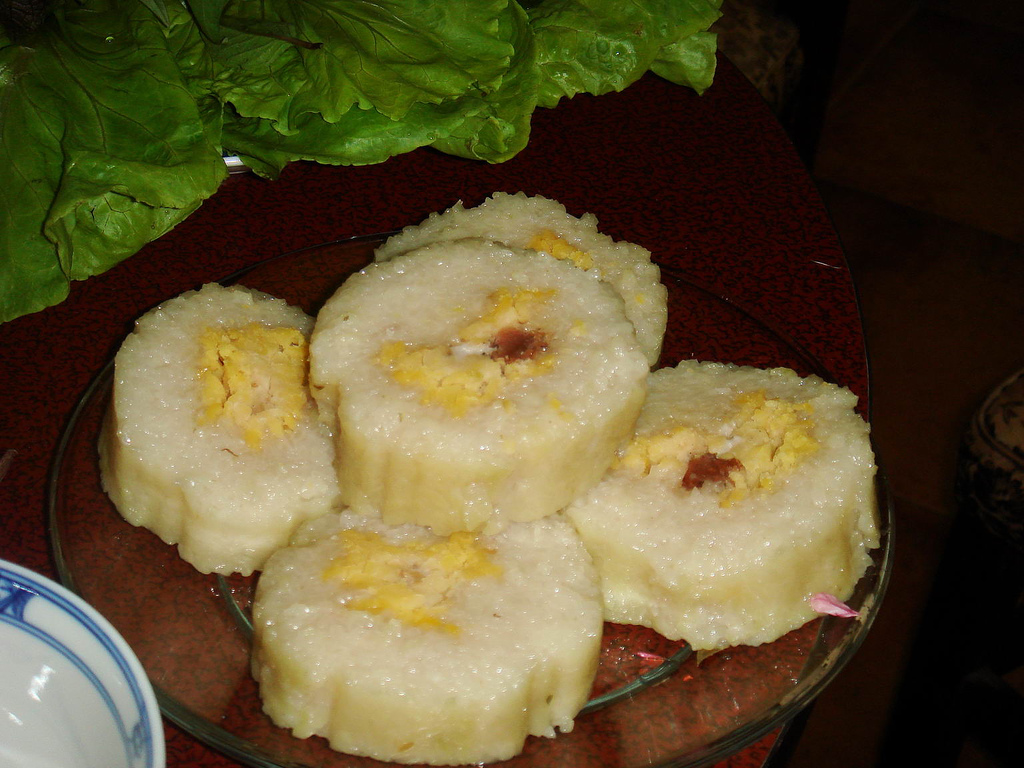
- A plate of bánh tét, with mung bean paste filling; with banana leaf removed and sliced into thick wheel-shaped slices just prior to serving
- Course: Snack
- Place of origin: Vietnam
- Region or state: Vietnam
- Main ingredients: Glutinous rice, banana leaf, meat or vegetarian filling (such as mung beans)
- Other information: Traditionally consumed during Tết

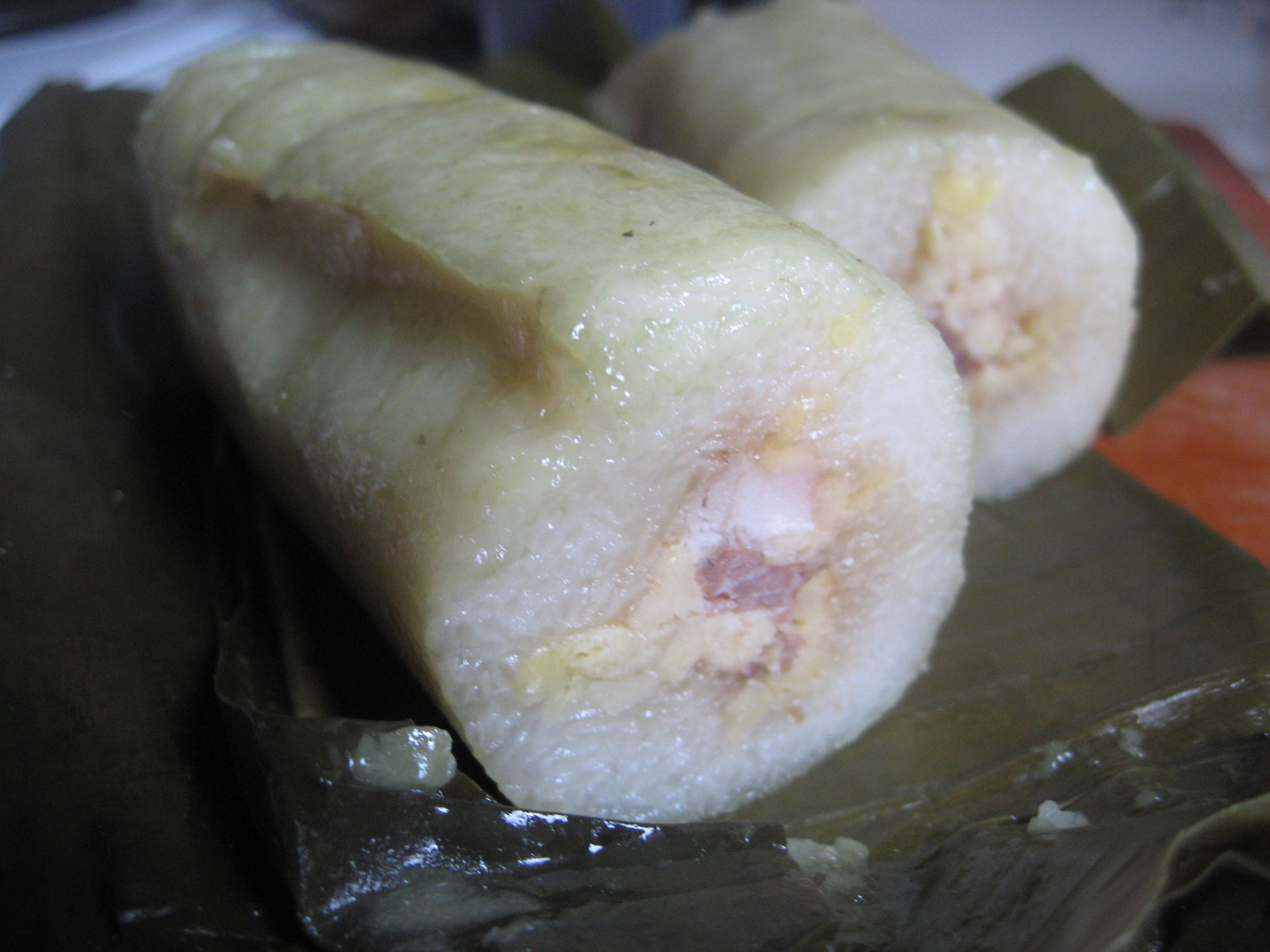
Bánh tét

Bánh tét is a Vietnamese savoury but sometimes sweetened cake made primarily from glutinous rice, which is rolled in a banana leaf into a thick, log-like cylindrical shape, with a mung bean and pork filling, then boiled. After cooking, the banana leaf is removed, and the cake is sliced into wheel-shaped servings.

== Etymology ==
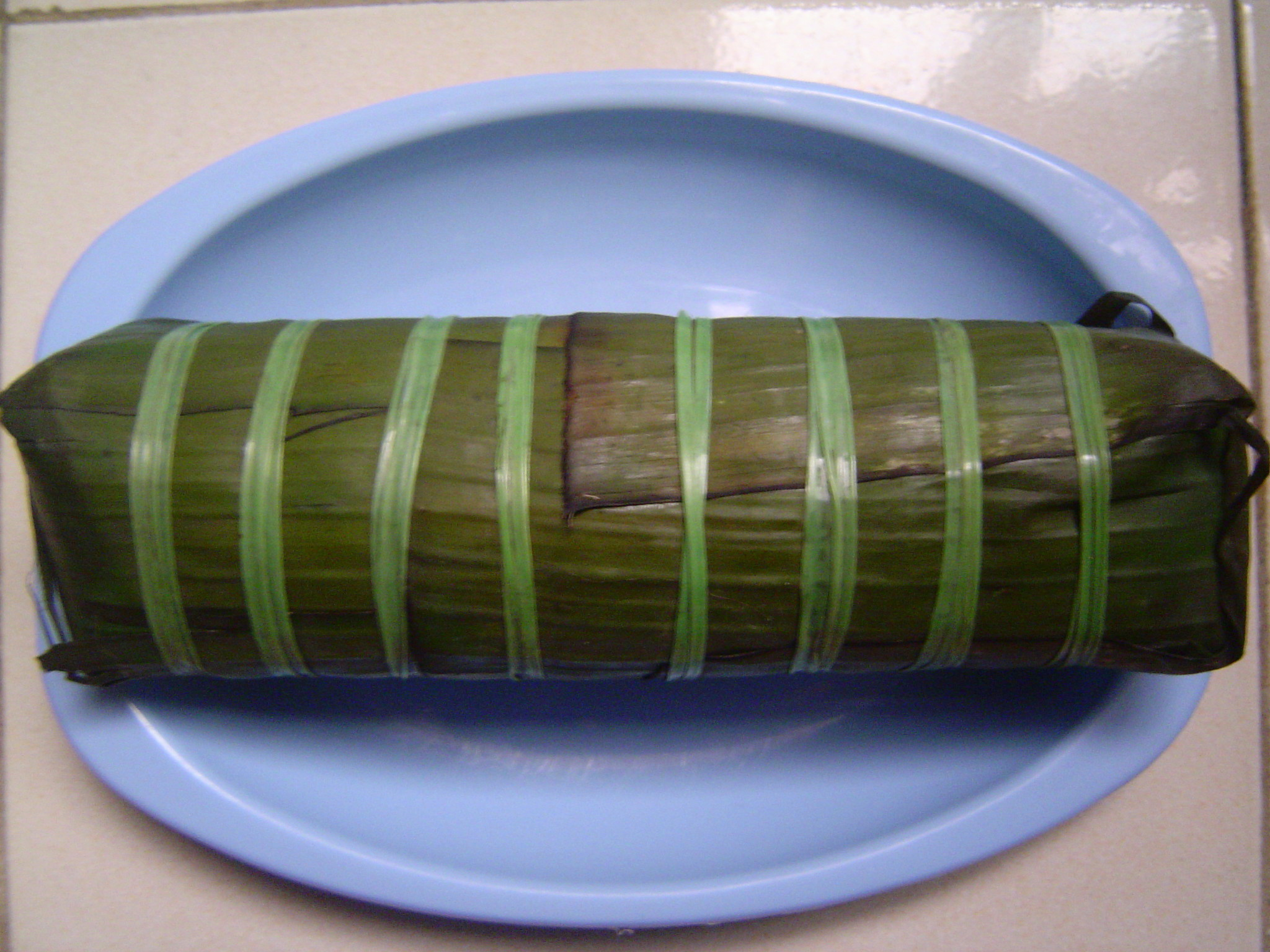
An intact, unpeeled bánh tét

Although bánh tét are made and consumed during Tết (the Vietnamese new year), the "tét" in the food's name literally means "sliced" or "split", possibly referring to the fact that it is served in slices. "Bánh" is used to refer to various baked and grilled food including small packages or "cakes", sandwiches, crepes, and spring rolls.

== Process ==
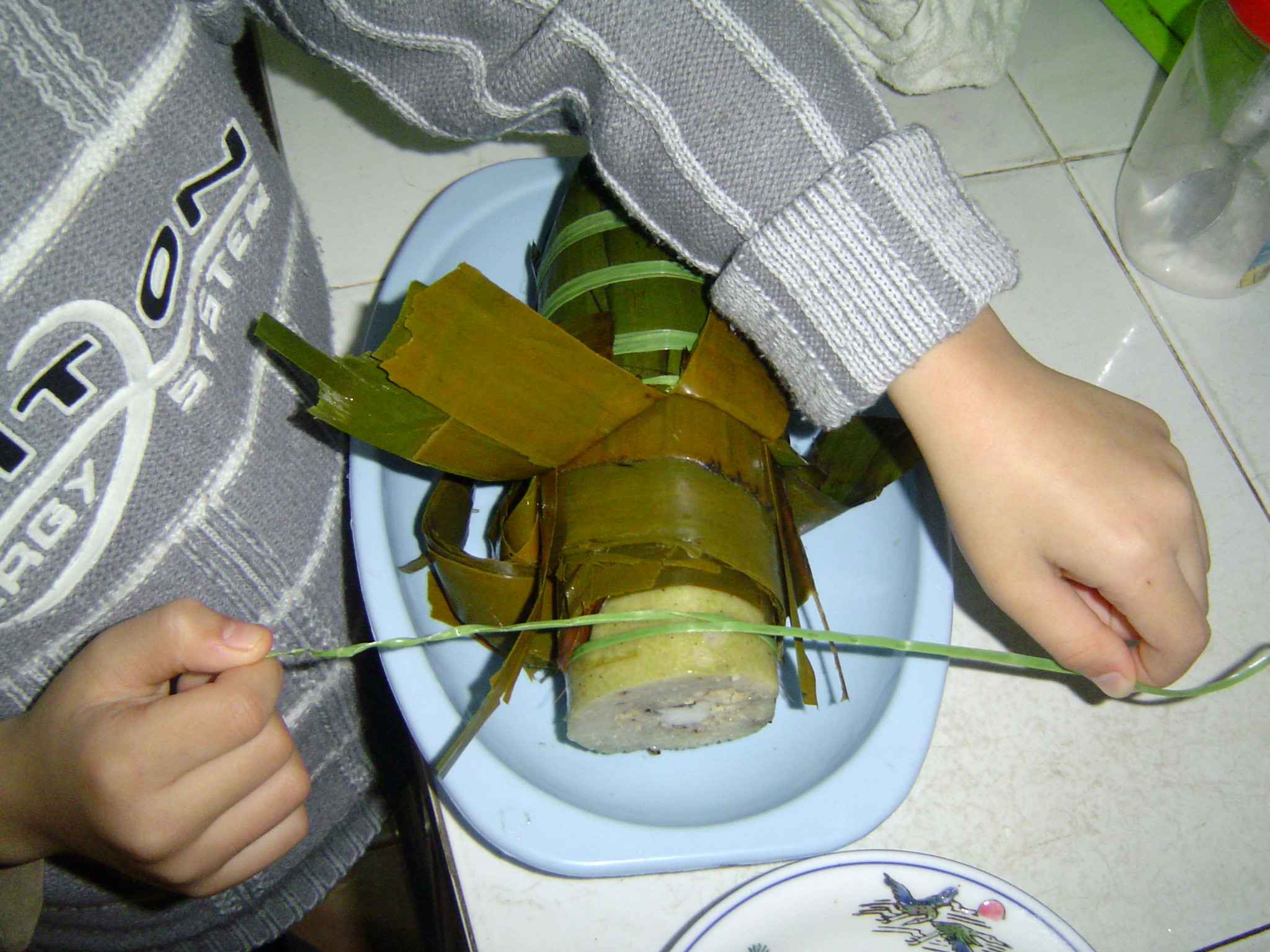
Cut bánh tét

The process of making bánh tét usually begins in preparation for Tết where the ingredients are prepared then cooked for at least six hours in a pot of boiling water. The first step is assembling the ingredients – glutinous rice, mung bean paste or soaked mung bean and pork belly. Next, the ingredients are layered on top of banana leaves before wrapped together tightly with strings. To prevent the banana leaf from coming apart during cooking, bánh tét are usually wrapped again several times with a length of plastic ribbon or rope before boiling in a large pot of water.

== Traditions ==
Bánh tét is a must-have traditional food in Vietnamese Lunar New Year. It demonstrates the importance of rice in the Vietnamese culture as well as historical value. During Vietnamese Tết, family members would gather together and enjoy feasting on bánh tét, the central food of this festive Vietnamese holiday to celebrate the coming of spring. The process of making bánh tét is time-consuming, but a tradition that many families still practice even in this modern society where pre-made bánh tét and bánh chưng are sold virtually in every Vietnamese store. It is the effort that counts and many choose to spend time with their family to create the holiday treat the traditional way. The process of making bánh tét is to provide an opportunity for family members to bond and come together to celebrate the holiday spirit.

The cake is eaten during the Vietnamese Lunar New Year holiday and can be eaten together with pickled scallions. The cake can also be fried.

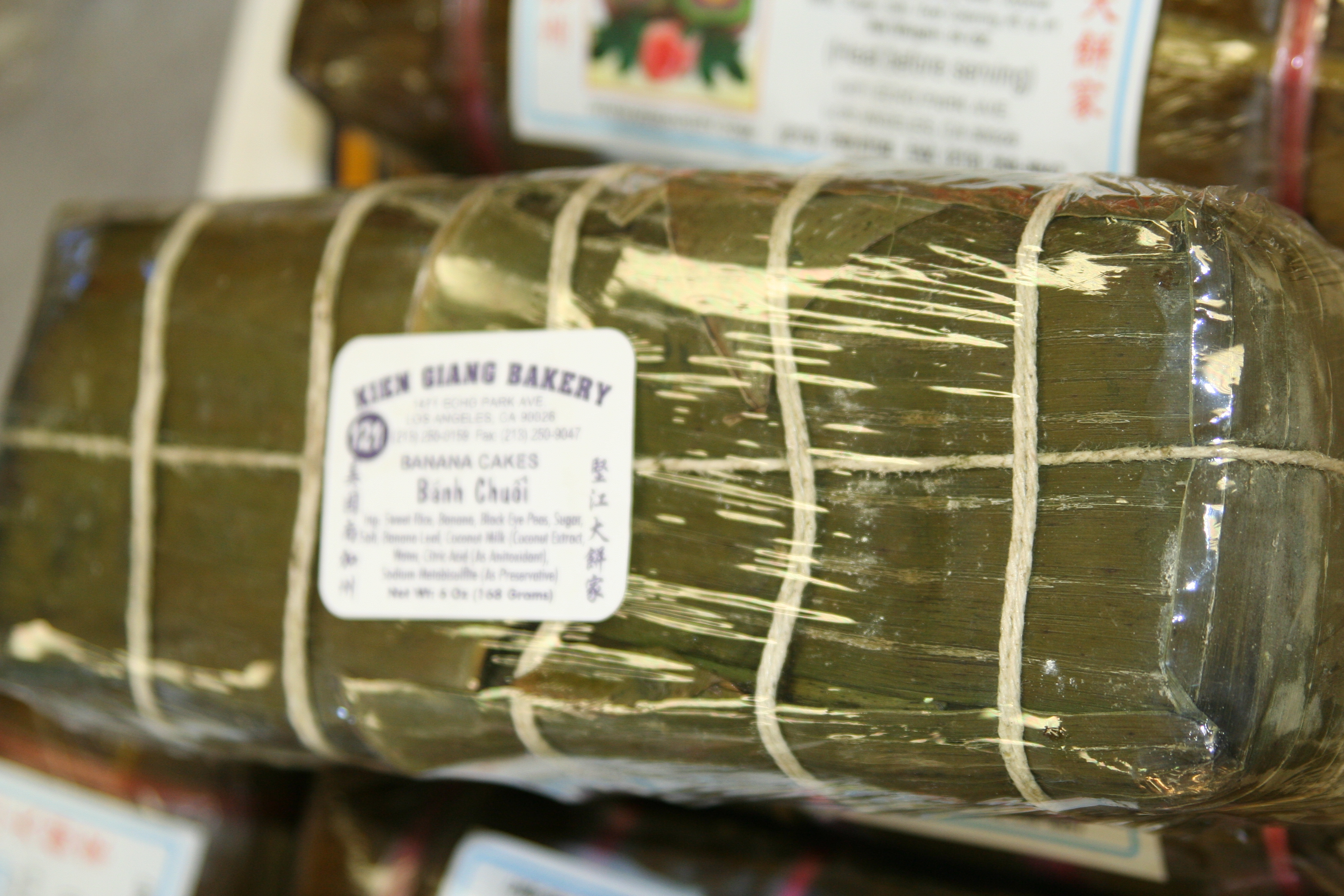
A large package of bánh tét chuối from a Los Angeles, California, bakery sold at a Los Angeles market for Tết in 2009

Bánh tét are traditional to and most popular in central and southern Vietnam. A similar food (though rectangular in shape) is called bánh chưng in the north.

- Bánh tét chuối is a bundle of rice with banana and sweet red bean filling steamed in banana leaves. This is the typical sweet version of bánh tét.

== Variety ==
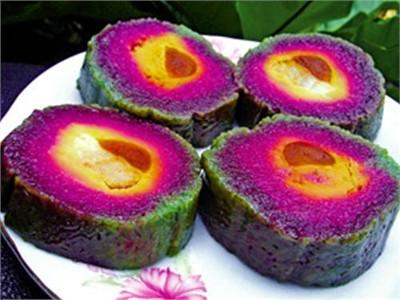
Bánh tét lá cẩm (magenta plant bánh tét)

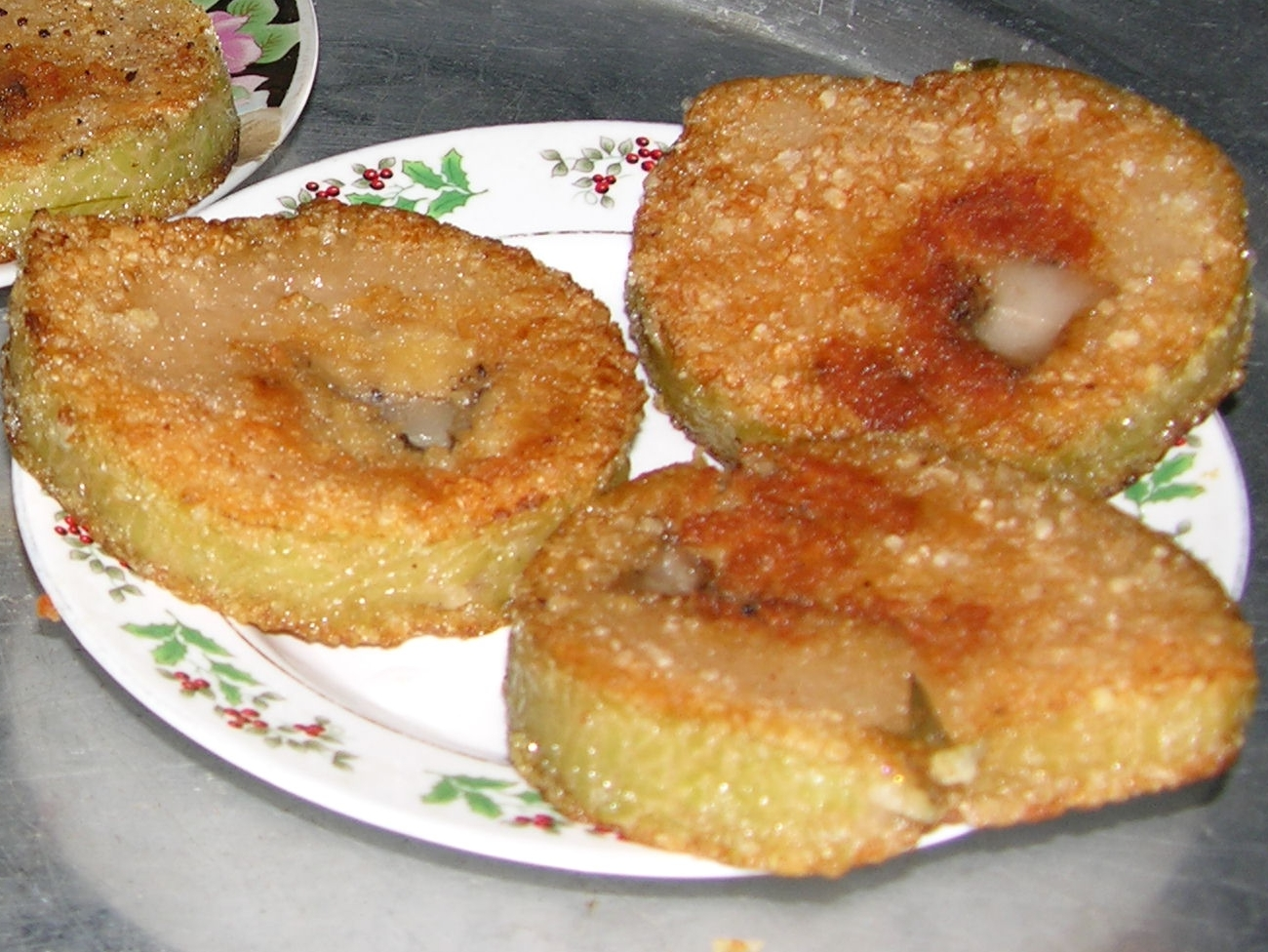
Fried bánh tét

Bánh tét has many varieties across Southern Vietnam. Besides the traditional "bánh tét" which is composed of sticky rice, pork belly (marinated with shallot, garlic and black pepper) and mung bean paste, the most famous variety of "bánh tét" in the southwest is "bánh tét chuối (banana bánh tét)", and in the southeast region the most well-known variety is "bánh tét bắp (corn bánh tét)". There is also a vegetarian version of "bánh tét" which contains no pork.

== See also ==
- Bánh
- Bánh chưng
- Bánh tẻ
- Hallaca
- List of stuffed dishes
- Lo mai gai
- Lotus leaf wrap
- Mochi
- Pamonha
- Pasteles
- Tamale
- Zongzi
- Corunda
- Num ansom
