= Num ansom =

Khmer sticky rice cake

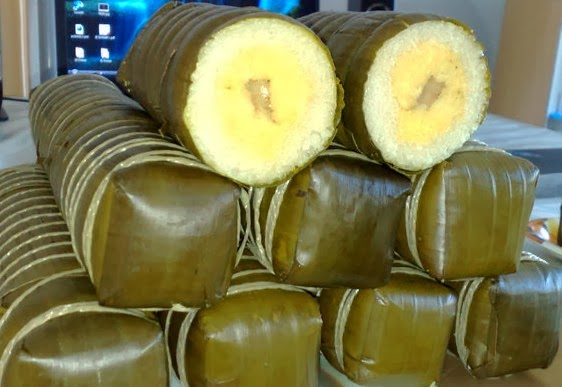
- Num ansom filled with pork and mung beans (num ansom chrouk).
- Alternative names: Num ansorm, ansom
- Course: Snack
- Place of origin: Cambodia
- Main ingredients: Glutinous rice, banana leaf, meat or vegetarian filling (such as mung beans)
- Other information: Traditionally consumed during Pchum Ben and Cambodian New Year

Num ansom (Khmer: នំអន្សម, num ânsâm, Khmer pronunciation: [nom ʔɑnsɑːm]) or simply ansom is a traditional Khmer sticky rice cake.

== Description ==
It is described as a cylinder-shaped cake made from glutinous rice that can either be filled with sugar bananas (នំអន្សមចេក, num ansom chek), jackfruits (នំអន្សមខ្នុរ, num ansom khnao), or pork (នំអន្សមជ្រូក, num ansom chrouk). In addition to steaming num ansom can also be fried or grilled depending on the occasion.

== Cultural significance ==
=== The linga-yoni of Khmer gastronomy ===
When Cambodia's temple-building traditions died out, so too did the architectural manifestations of Shiva Lingam and Yoni. Nonetheless, the concept of Mea Ba, or the respect of mother and father, persisted, and is still present in Khmer gastronomy. Thus, these two cakes are indispensable components of the Khmer traditional wedding.

Num ansom is associated in Khmer culture with a banana leaf-wrapped steamed counterpart, the num kom. The cylinder shape of the num ansom represents a phallus, symbolizing Shiva, the masculine principle of God, while the pyramid shape of the num kom symbolizes the Uma, his consort.

In popular Khmer culture, the cakes represent the two heads of the household. In 2015, the provocative pop star Neay Koeun released a comedic song called 'Darling! You Throw My Num Ansom Away and Go Eat Baguette' in which the phallic attribute of the food was a suggestive dominant theme.

=== In Khmer New Year and Pchum Ben ===
Sticky rice cakes are given as offerings to the manes of the ancestors on Pchum Ben to gain their blessing to the rice fields. At the same time, the nom ansom is also typical for the Khmer New Year, as recorded in the novel of Khmer author Vaddey Ratner. In some ways, it is the manes of ancestors, both of the individual families, remembered during Pchum Ben, and of the Khmer people as a whole, remembered during the Khmer New Year.

=== Biggest num ansom in the world ===
During Angkor Sankranta event at Siem Reap in April back in 2015, Cambodia broke the Guinness World Record of the Largest Sticky Rice Cake. The cake weighed 4 tons (4,040 kg). It took about 100 Khmer chefs and almost two days to cook and was approved by the Guinness World Records as the biggest cake in the world on the 13th April 2015 during the Khmer New Year. Political commentators were critical of this world record seeing in it a political stunt or a "recipe for youth appeal", as the sticky rice cake was produced after long street protests and a parliamentary boycott over the results of the 2013 Cambodian general election.

== See also ==
- Bánh tét
