= Timeline of Vietnam under Chinese rule =

This is a timeline of Vietnamese history under Chinese rule from the 3rd century BC to 905.

== 3rd century BC ==
Year	Date	Event
257 BC		Thục Phán of the Âu Việt invades Văn Lang and creates Âu Lạc
207 BC		Qin general Zhao Tuo captures the Cổ Loa Citadel and defeats Âu Lạc, creating the two administrative regions of Jiaozhi (Giao Chỉ) and Jiuzhen (Cửu Chân)
203 BC		Zhao Tuo declares himself king of Nanyue (Nam Việt)

== 2nd century BC ==
Year	Date	Event
198 BC		Two legates are assigned to oversee affairs in Jiaozhi and Jiuzhen
181 BC		Nanyue attacks Changsha
111 BC		Han conquest of Nanyue: Han general Lu Bode conquers Nanyue and separates it into Jiaozhi, Jiuzhen, Cangwu, Nanhai, Yulin, Hepu, Dan'er, and Zhuya. Starts First Era of Northern Domination.

== 1st century ==
Year	Date	Event
2		Census records for Jiaozhi, Jiuzhen, and Rinan record 143,643 households and a population of 981,755
40		Trung sisters' rebellion: Yue tribes rebel in Jiaozhi
42		Trung sisters' rebellion: Ma Yuan leads an expedition to Jiaozhi
43		Trung sisters' rebellion: The Trưng Sisters are decapitated

== 2nd century ==
Year	Date	Event
100		A rebellion in Jiaozhi is put down
136		People known as the Qulian from beyond the southern frontier attack Rinan Commandery, causing turmoil and confusion
137		Rinan rebels
144		Rinan rebels
157		Chu Đạt rebels in Jiuzhen Commandery and is defeated
160		Shi Ci becomes administrator of Rinan
190		Shi Ci's son Shi Xie appoints his brothers Shi Yi, Shi Wei, and Shi Wu as administrators of Hepu, Jiuzhen, and Nanhai
192		The southernmost district of Rinan Commandery, Xianglin, breaks away and becomes the Kingdom of Lâm Ấp, otherwise known as Champa

== 3rd century ==
Year	Date	Event
211		Shi Xie submits to Sun Quan's overlordship
217		Shi Xie sends his son Shi Xin to Sun Quan as hostage
226		Shi Xie dies and Sun Quan's general Lü Dai kills his family; Shi Xie, also called Sĩ Nhiếp in Vietnamese, is remembered today in Vietnam as the father of education and Buddhism - according to Stephen O'Harrow, he was essentially "the first Vietnamese"
248		Lâm Ấp (probably Champa) seizes Rinan while Lady Triệu rebels unsuccessfully against Sun Wu

== 4th century ==
Year	Date	Event
347		Lâm Ấp invades Jiaozhi but is repulsed by the Jin dynasty (266–420)
359		Lâm Ấp is defeated
377		Li Xun seizes Jiuzhen
380		Teng Dunzhi becomes governor of Jiaozhi after Du Yuan kills Li Xun
399		Du Yuan becomes governor of Jiaozhi and defeats a Lâm Ấp invasion

== 5th century ==
Year	Date	Event
405		Lâm Ấp attacks Jiaozhi
410		Du Yuan dies and is succeeded by Du Huidu
411		A rebel army under Lu Xun attempts to seize control over Jiaozhi but fails
413		Lâm Ấp attacks Jiaozhi
415		Lâm Ấp attacks Jiaozhi
423		Du Huidu dies and is succeeded by Du Hongwen
424		Lâm Ấp attacks Jiaozhi
427		Du Hongwen leaves Jiaozhi for the court after receiving an appointment
443		Tan Hezhi, governor of Jiaozhi, starts recruiting an army
446		Tan Hezhi invades Lâm Ấp and pushes them back to the area around modern Da Nang
468		Two brothers Lý Trường Nhân and Lý Thúc Hiến rebel against the Liu Song dynasty, emperor Emperor Ming of Song de jure recognizes Lý Trường Nhân as Thứ sử (province governor, cishi)
485		Lý Thúc Hiến surrenders to Qi Dynasty

== 6th century ==
Year	Date	Event
541		Lý Bôn (503–548) rebels and attacks Liang officials
544	February	Lý Bôn establishes the Early Lý dynasty (Kingdom of Vạn Xuân) and becomes Lý Nam Đế (Southern Emperor)
545		Chen Baxian drives Lý Nam Đế into the mountains, where he is eventually killed, but resistance continues under Lý Thiên Bảo

== 7th century ==
Year	Date	Event
602		Sui–Former Lý War: Sui forces under Liu Fang annex the kingdom of Vạn Xuân
618		Transition from Sui to Tang: Sui military leaders in Jiaozhou follow Xiao Xian fight against the new Tang Empire
622		Transition from Sui to Tang: Li Yuan and his forces defeat Xiao Xian, then arrive Tống Bình (Hanoi). Jiaozhou governor Khâu Hòa (552–637) surrenders to Tang dynasty. Jiaozhou is incorporated into Tang Empire
679		Jiaozhi is renamed Annan (An Nam)
687		Lý Tự Tiên and Đinh Kiến revolt at Đại La in response to a raise in harvest tax
691		I-ching's book Commentary about Monks of the Great Tang mentions 6 Vietnamese Buddhist monks who traveled to India

== 8th century ==
Year	Date	Event
722		Mai Thúc Loan rebels in Annan and is defeated
767		Srivijaya fleets invade Annan and are defeated
785		Phùng Hưng rebels in Annan
791		Tang regains control of Annan

== 9th century ==
Year	Date	Event
803		Champa seizes southern Annan
846		Nanzhao raids Annan
858		Rebellion breaks out in Annan and is put down
861		Nanzhao attacks Bo Prefecture and Annan but is repulsed.
863		Nanzhao conquers Annan
866		Gao Pian retakes Annan from Nanzhao and establishes the Jinghai Army (Military Command)
874		Tang dynasty launches a campaign against aboriginal forces
877		Troops deployed from Annan rebel in Guangxi
879		Campaign against aboriginal forces ends
880		A Tang garrison at Đại La mutinies, forcing Zeng Gun to withdraw troops from the south and relinquish control over Annan; ending de facto Chinese control over Vietnam

== 10th century ==
Year	Date	Event
904		Zhu Wen's brother Quanyu tries to enter Annan but is immediately dismissed the next year for being "stupid and without ability"
906		Khúc Thừa Dụ of the Khúc clan takes control of Annan and establishes tributary relations with Later Liang

== Gallery ==
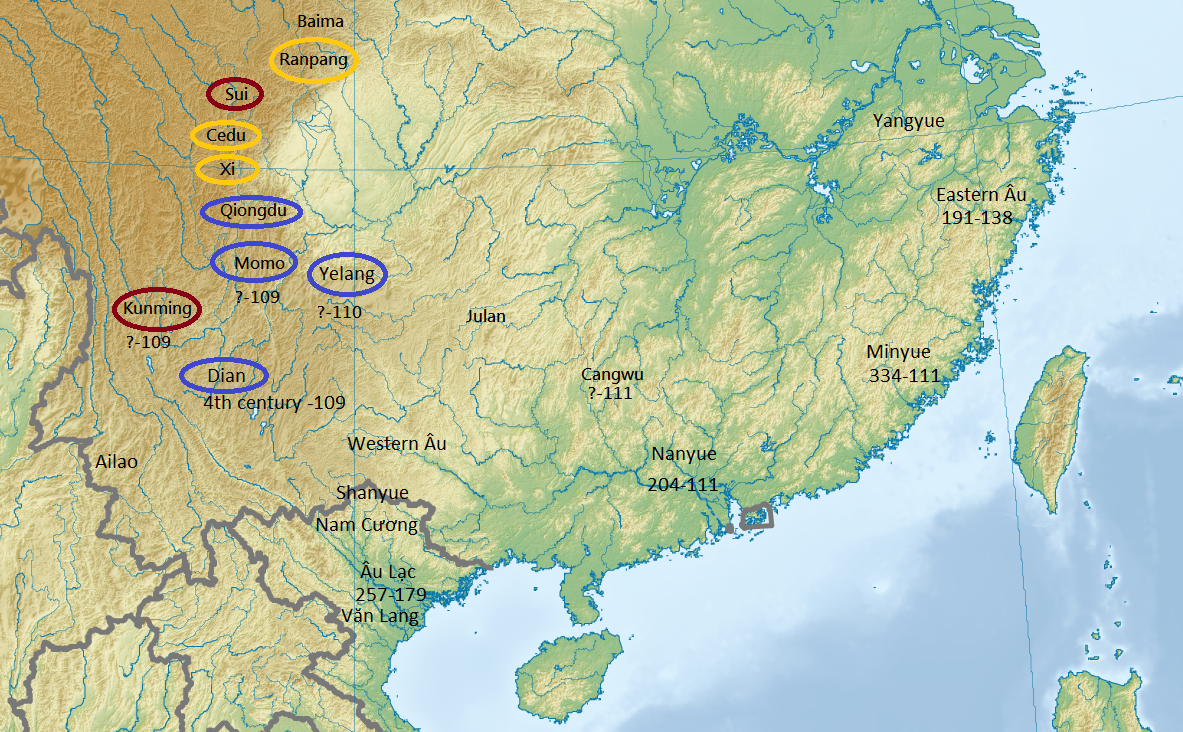
Yue/Viet tribes pre-Han conquest

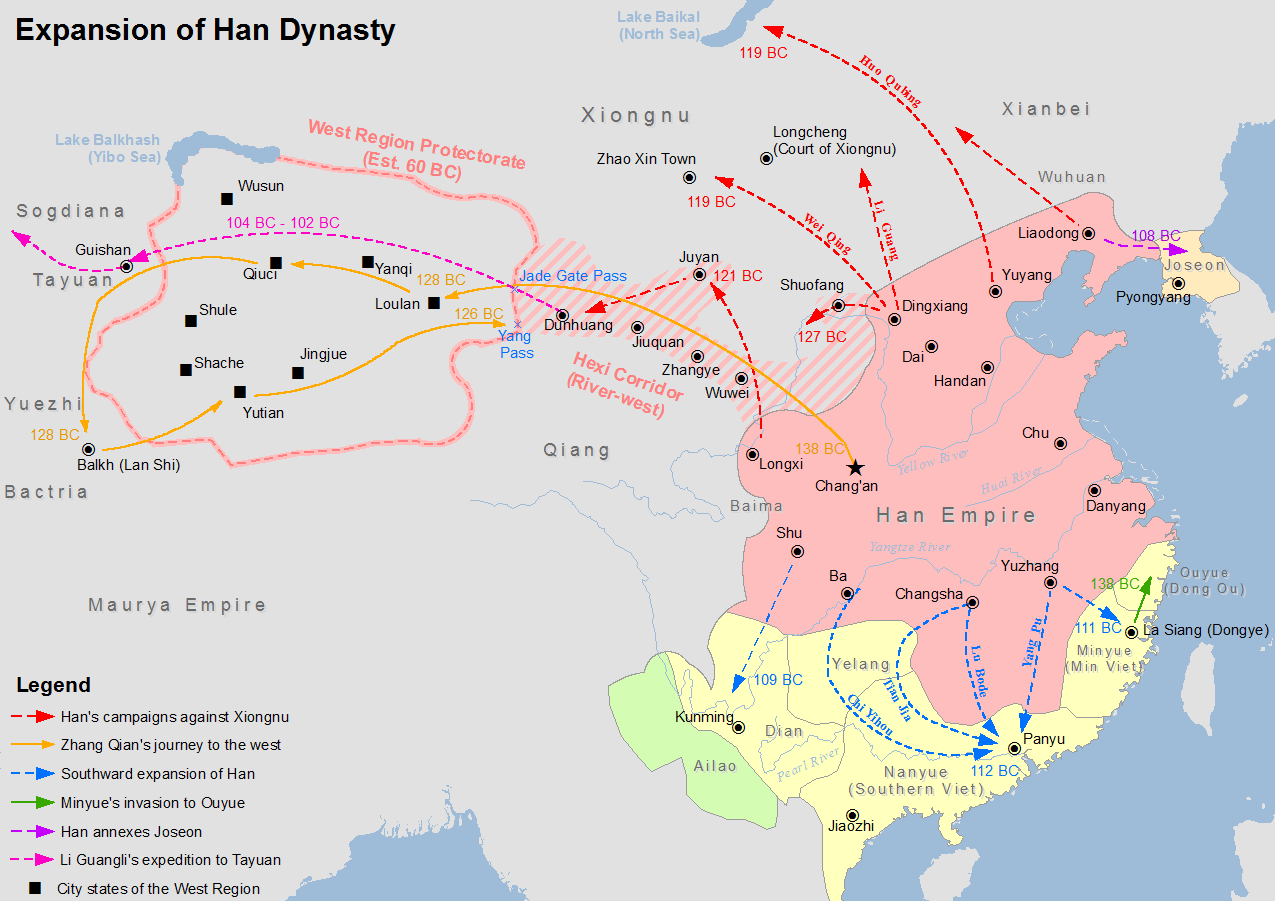
Han conquest of Nanyue in 112 BC

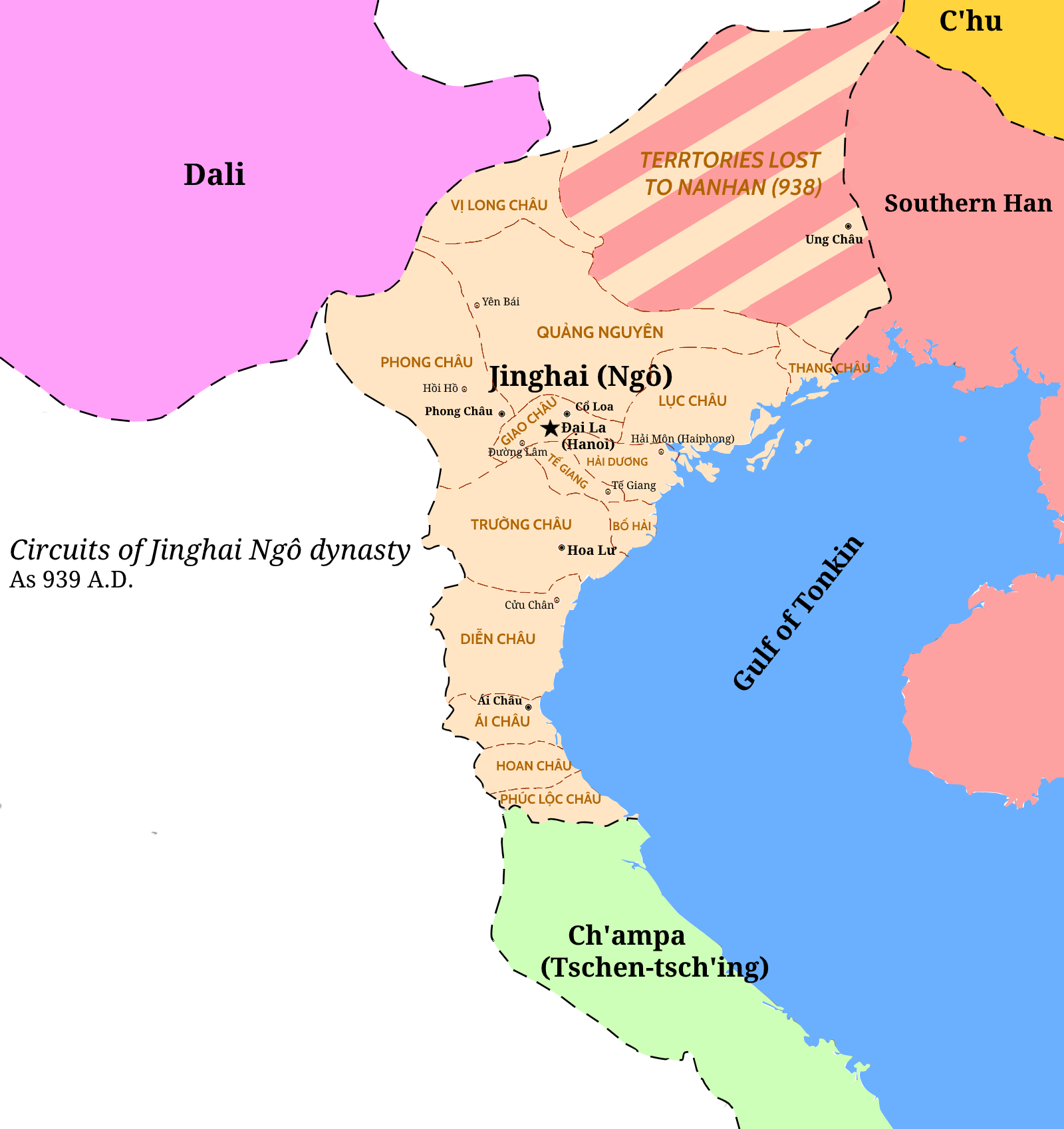
Ngô dynasty in 938

== See also ==
- Annam (province) (Annan)
- Tĩnh Hải quân (Jinghai Jun)
- Timeline of the Lý dynasty

== Bibliography ==
- Crespigny, Rafe (2007), A Biographical Dictionary of Later Han to the Three Kingdoms (23-220 AD), Brill
- Herman, John E. (2007), Amid the Clouds and Mist China's Colonization of Guizhou, 1200–1700, Harvard University Asia Center, ISBN 978-0-674-02591-2
- Kiernan, Ben (2019). Việt Nam: a history from earliest time to the present. Oxford University Press. ISBN 9780190053796.
- Taylor, K.W. (1983), The Birth of the Vietnamese, University of California Press
- Taylor, K.W. (2013), A History of the Vietnamese, Cambridge University Press
- Twitchett, Denis (2008), The Cambridge History of China 1, Cambridge University Press
- Xiong, Victor Cunrui (2009), Historical Dictionary of Medieval China, United States of America: Scarecrow Press, Inc., ISBN 978-0810860537
- Chua, Amy (2018), Political Tribes: Group Instinct and the Fate of Nations, Penguin Press, ISBN 978-0399562853
