= Panyu (ancient city) =

Panyu (Chinese: 蕃隅 or 蕃禺/番禺, Vietnamese: Phiên Ngung), reconstructed in Old Chinese pronunciation as Paungoo or P'angu, was the capital of Nanyue under the Triệu dynasty in the 3rd–2nd centuries BC and of Southern Han in the 10th century. It is located in present-day Guangzhou, Guangdong Province, China.

== History ==
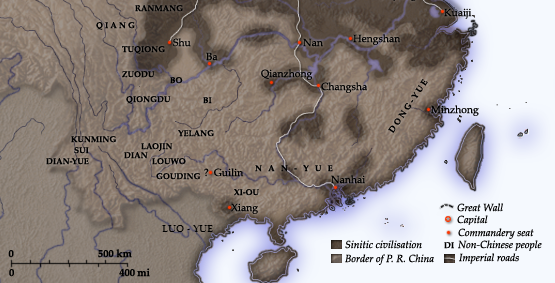
Location of Panyu on the map of scattered territories during the Qin dynasty's campaign against the Baiyue around 210 BC.

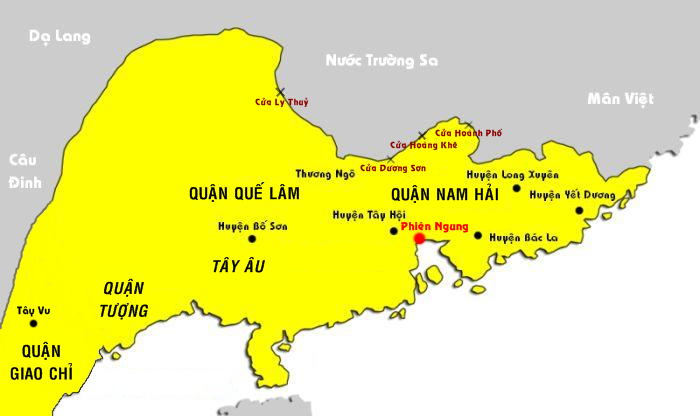
Location of Panyu in Nanhai Commandery of Nanyue.

In ancient times, the Panyu area was also known by other names such as Chuting (Chu Pavilion, referring to the power center of the State of Chu) and Yangcheng (City of Rams). This originated from a myth about five immortals wearing five-colored garments, each in a different hue, riding five rams of different coat colors and carrying flutes containing six types of grains and fruits, bringing bountiful harvests and abundant fruits to the local people. Today, to pray for prosperity as blessed by the immortals, a grand statue of the Five Rams stands in Yuexiu Park, serving as the symbol of Guangzhou. Near the Five Rams Statue is another scenic spot featuring a mural of agricultural life and harvest festival dances, carved into a stone wall hundreds of meters long along the cliffside.

Panyu was the earliest name of the city of Guangzhou, established over 2,000 years ago. In 214 BC, when the Qin dynasty subdued the Baiyue people in the Lingnan region, it established Panyu as the seat of Nanhai Commandery. At the end of the Qin dynasty (contemporary with the era of An Dương Vương of Âu Lạc), the Qin official Zhao Tuo (Triệu Đà) carved out a realm in the Lingnan region, named the state Nanyue, and established his capital at Panyu, naming the citadel Yue Citadel. By the Three Kingdoms period, Eastern Wu occupied the Lingnan region and controlled Jiaozhou (which then encompassed both Liangguang and Northern Vietnam). Eastern Wu renovated Yue Citadel in Panyu and moved the capital of Jiaozhou from Guangxin County to Panyu. In 226, Eastern Wu divided Jiaozhou into two provinces: Guangzhou, comprising the commanderies of Nanhai, Yulin, and Cangwu; and the new Jiaozhou, comprising the commanderies of Hepu, Jiaozhi, Jiuzhen, and Rinan. Eastern Wu appointed Shi Hui (Sĩ Huy), son of Shi Xie (Sĩ Nhiếp), as Administrator of Jiuzhen Commandery, but Shi Hui disobeyed the order and raised troops to seize Jiaozhi Commandery. The Inspector of the new Jiaozhou, Dai Liang (Đái Lương), and the Inspector of Guangzhou, Lü Dai (Lã Đại), combined forces to attack and kill Shi Hui and his brothers. With the separatist forces in Jiaozhou suppressed, Eastern Wu merged Guangzhou back into Jiaozhou as before and appointed Lü Dai as Inspector of Jiaozhou. In 264, because Lü Xing (Lã Hưng) rose up to seize Jiaozhi and submitted to Cao Wei (succeeded by Western Jin), Eastern Wu once again split off the northern commanderies still under its control to re-establish Guangzhou (with its seat at Panyu) as in 226; the other four commanderies remained under Jiaozhou (with its seat at Long Uyên, in present-day Gia Lâm District, Hanoi), for which the Jin dynasty appointed Huo Yi (Hoắc Dặc) as Inspector in absentia. When the Eastern Wu general Tao Huang (Đào Hoàng) recaptured Jiaozhou in 271, the administration kept Guangzhou and Jiaozhou separate as in 264 without re-merging them, a division maintained thereafter.

== See also ==
- Triệu dynasty
- Nanyue
- Museum of the Mausoleum of the Nanyue King
- Jiaozhou
- Southern Han
- Panyu District
