= First Era of Northern Domination =

First Han Dynasty rule of Vietnam (111 BC-40 AD)

First Era of Northern Domination Bắc thuộc lần thứ nhất 北屬吝次一
- 111 BC–40 AD
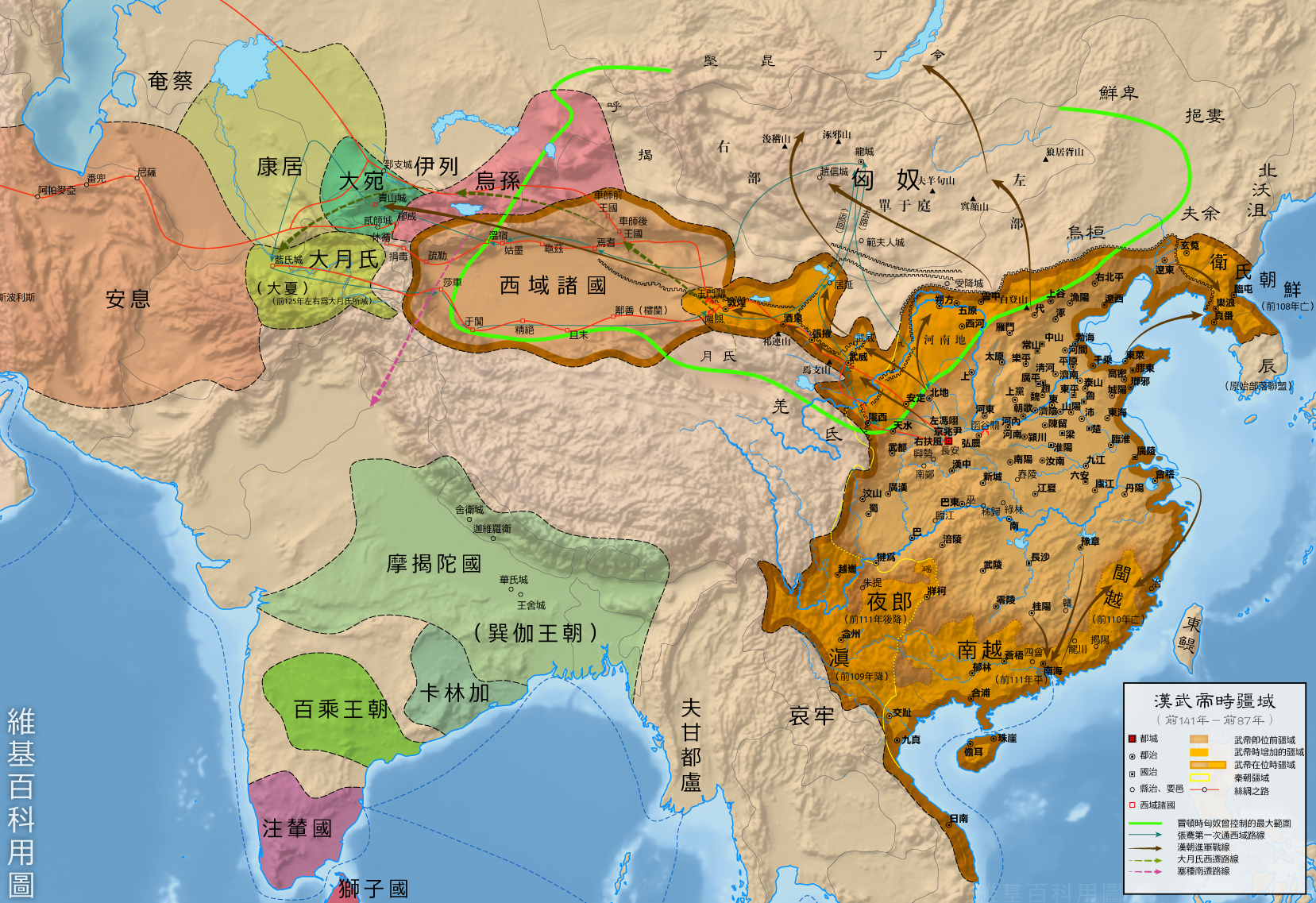
- Map of the Han dynasty under Emperor Wu of Han
- Status: Commanderies of the Western Han dynasty (111 BC – 9 AD), Commanderies of the Xin dynasty (9 AD – 23 AD); Commanderies of the Eastern Han dynasty (24 AD – 40 AD)
- Capital: Long Biên
- Government: Monarchy
- Emperor
  - 111–87 BC: Emperor Wu of Han (first)
  - 87–74 BC: Emperor Zhao of Han
  - 40 AD: Emperor Guangwu of Han (last)
- History
  - Han-Nam Việt War: 111 BC
  - Establishment of Jiaozhi province: 111 BC
  - Trưng sisters Uprising: 40 AD
- Currency: Cash coins
Preceded by	Succeeded by
Nanyue	Trưng sisters
- Today part of: Vietnam; China

The First Era of Northern Domination refers to the period of Vietnamese history during which present-day northern Vietnam was under the rule of the Han dynasty and the interregnum Xin dynasty as Jiaozhi and Jiaozhou Commanderies. It is considered the first of four periods of Chinese rule over Vietnam, and the first of the three in which were almost continuous and was referred to as Bắc thuộc ("Northern Domination"). It began in 111 BC when the Western Han dynasty under its seventh emperor, Emperor Wu, conquered the defiant vassal state of Nanyue during its southward expansion and annexed all of the Lingnan region, which included what is today Guangdong and Guangxi together with much of modern northern Vietnam and half of central Vietnam. This era ended with the Trưng sisters' rebellion in 40 AD, which lasted three years before being quelled by Eastern Han dynasty general Ma Yuan, who restored Han rule and began Vietnam's Second Era of Northern Domination.

== Background ==
=== Pre-sinicization Yue identity ===
Because the Han dynasty historians did not keep accurate and detailed records of the personal and cultural identities of the Yue people, much of the information now known is in relation to their political and governmental roles that the Imperial Han court came into contact with by means of trade and colonization.

Those who were referred to as Yue may not have claimed the identity signifier for themselves. It was a term placed onto them and their culture by outsider forces. Since there was not one cohesively defined and unified “Yue” culture, the term encompassed several different groups of people with varying cultural identities that ranged throughout what is now the southern Chinese Provinces and Northern Vietnam. The inhabitants indigenous to the southernmost territories of Northern and Central China were referred to as the “Hundred Yue” to allude to the numerous different upland tribal hill cultures that made up the singular Baiyue identity.

=== Qin campaigns against Yue kingdoms ===
After Qin Shi Huang defeated the state of Chu in 223 BC, the Qin dynasty in 221 BC undertook a military campaign against the Baiyue in Lingnan to conquer the territories of what is now southern China and northern Vietnam. The emperor ordered his armies of five hundred thousand men to advance southward in the five columns to conquer and annex the Yue territories into the Qin empire. By 214 BC, Guangdong, Guangxi, and parts of northern Vietnam were subjugated and annexed into the Qin Empire. However, Chinese domination was brief and the collapse of the Qin dynasty led the Yue tribes to regain their independence.

=== Formation of Nanyue ===
Following the collapse of the Qin dynasty, Zhao Tuo, a general of the Qin dynasty, took advantage of the Qin's decline and the South region's crumbling political structure to set up his own kingdom, Nanyue. Nanyue was centered on Panyu (modern-day Guangzhou) and stretched from present-day Vietnam to modern-day Hunan.

In 179 BC, Zhao Tuo conquered the Vietnamese state of Âu Lạc. Despite coming from the North, Zhao Tuo assimilated into the Yue culture and created a new identity as the King of Nanyue. Zhao Tuo married a Yue woman, incorporated locals into his army, and even fought off Han invasions later on to protect his kingdom. Some historians do not see him as a foreign conqueror, but as the defender of Vietnam against the Han Chinese, and the legitimacy of the Triệu dynasty continues to be the source of debate among Vietnamese historians. Nevertheless, Zhao Tuo sought to extend his territory further south to the Red River Delta region.

Despite Zhao Tuo's commitment to assimilate the Yue tribes, Han Chinese influences were still introduced to the Yue peoples. He brought Han culture with him to Nanyue, leading to a syncretic fusion of Han and Yue styles in musical forms, handicrafts, and motifs. Artifacts uncovered from the Nanyue Kingdom display cultural mixture between the two cultures, especially from the tomb of Zhao Mo which displayed and exalted Han grandeur. Besides Zhao Tuo, members of the Han court and other Northern Han constituents of the Chinese sociopolitical elite who migrated to the South have also influenced Yue culture. Despite Nanyue being an autonomous entity that operated independently from the imperial authority of the Han dynasty's confines, the permeation of Han Chinese influences still remained prevalent in the region. Since Nanyue was under the suzerainty of Han imperial influence, its inhabitants often had to make tributes to the Han government leading to constant interactions between the two geopolitical entities. Furthermore, the Nanyue kingdom's elites encapsulated a mix of Northern Han Chinese who moved to the south intermingling with the former Yue elite bringing a syncretic interflow of the Han and Yue cultures. Nanyue's social elites soon became culturally mixed over time and would later take advantage of their commingled linguistic skills during the eventual Han conquest to act and serve as the linking agents between the Yue tribes and Han Chinese.

One of the main reasons why the Yue culture became so heavily intermingled with Chinese culture was because there were no definitive borders denoted and demarcated between the two regions. Chinese peasants were compelled to move farther and farther south because the temperate climate and terrain were more conducive to successfully growing and maintaining crops. As they crossed the seemingly imaginary border, more and more farmers became acquainted with the Yue peoples and their cultures. This indefinite border made it so that the Chinese culture and the Yue peoples increasingly intersected and influenced each other over time, eventually becoming a contributing factor to the successive Chinese dynasties and empires making military incursions towards the south to penetrate and conquer the Yue peoples and acquire their land.

== History ==
=== Han conquest of Nanyue ===
In 196 BC, Emperor Gaozu sent Lu Jia on a diplomatic mission to Nanyue to officially recognize Zhao Tuo. Nevertheless, relations between Han and Nanyue were sometimes strained. Zhao Tuo resented Empress Lü's ban on exports of metal wares and female livestock to Nanyue. In 183 BC, he proclaimed himself the "Martial Emperor of the Southern Yue" (南越武帝), which implied a perceived status on equal footing with the Han emperor. Two years later, Nanyue attacked the Changsha Kingdom, a constituent kingdom of the Han empire. In 180 BC, Lu Jia led a diplomatic mission to Nanyue that succeeded in convincing Zhao Tuo to give up on his title as emperor and pay homage to Han as a nominal vassal.

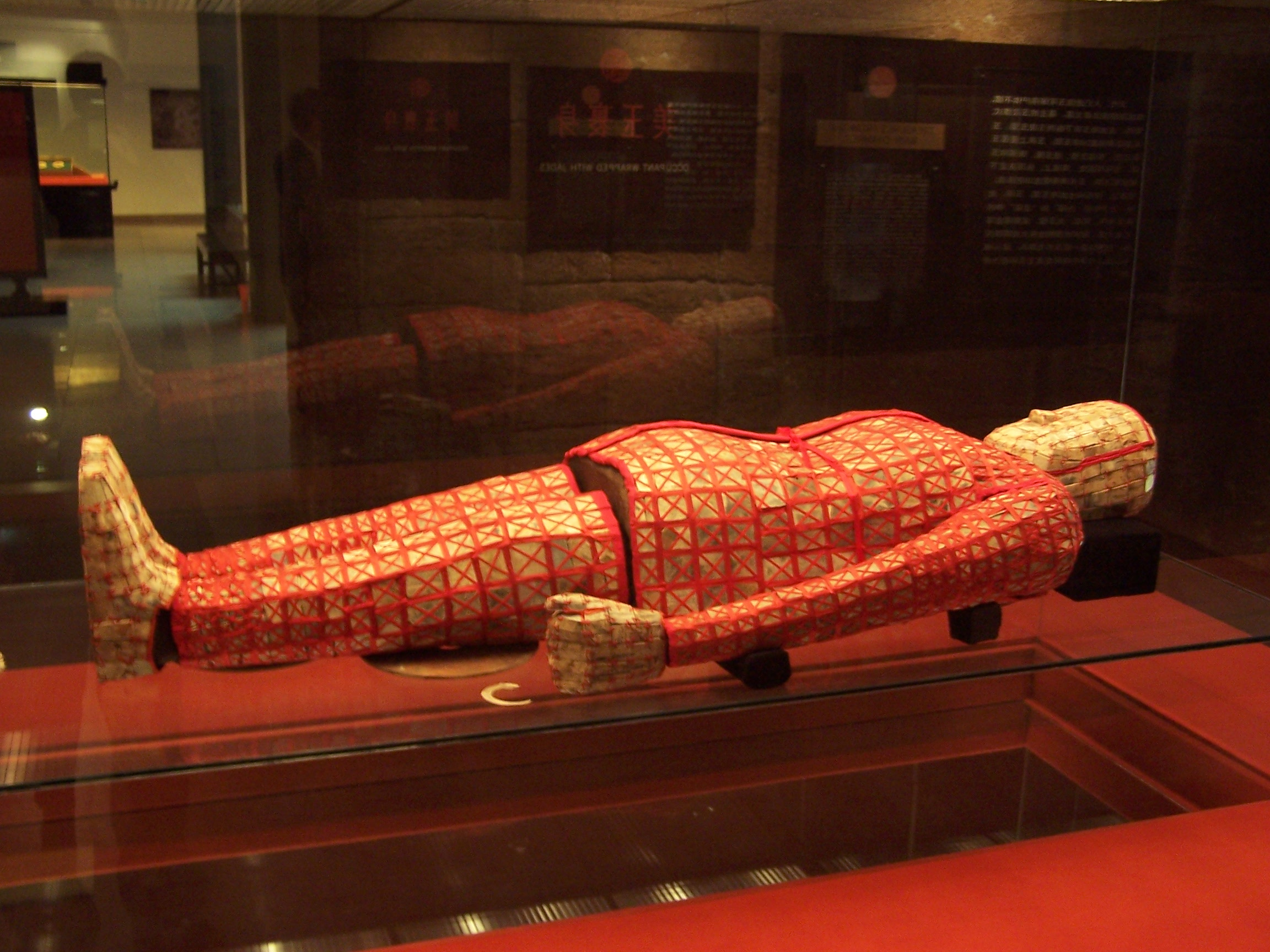
Jade burial suit of King Zhao Mo

In 135 BC, King Zhao Mo of Nanyue appealed to the Han court for help against attacking Minyue forces. The Han court responded swiftly and this led to Zhao Mo's agreement to send his son, Prince Zhao Yingqi, to serve in the palace at Chang'an. At the Nanyue court in 113 BC, the Queen Dowager of Nanyue suggested incorporating Nanyue as a kingdom under the suzerainty of the Han empire, thus formally integrating the kingdom on the same terms as the other kingdoms of the Han empire. Queen Dowager Jiu was of Han Chinese stock herself and was married to Zhao Yingqi. However, many Nanyue ministers opposed this suggestion. Lü Jia was the primary Nanyue official to oppose the idea and he led the opposition against the Queen Dowager. In 112 BC, the opposition retaliated violently and executed the Queen Dowager, a provocation that led to the mobilization of a large Han naval force into Nanyue.

The Han imperial military forces consisted of six armies that traveled by sea, directly southward, or from Sichuan along the Xi River. In 111 BC, General Lu Bode and General Yang Pu advanced towards Panyu (present-day Guangzhou). This resulted in the surrender of Nanyue in which it was annexed and subsumed into the Han empire later that year.

=== Trung sisters' uprising ===
In March 40 AD, the Trưng sisters, Trưng Trắc (徵側; Zheng Ce) and Trưng Nhị (徵貳; Zheng Er), led the Lac Viet people to rise up in the Trưng sisters' rebellion against the Han in Jiaozhi. It began at the Red River Delta, but soon spread to other Yue tribes along the coast to the north and south. The uprising gained the support of about sixty-five towns and settlements. Trưng Trắc was eventually proclaimed as the queen. Even though she gained control over the countryside, she was not able to capture the fortified towns.

A military campaign led by Han general Ma Yuan from 42 AD to 43 AD led to the Han reconquest of the region, leading to the capture and decapitation of the Trưng sisters and the start of the Second Era of Northern Domination.

== Sinicization ==
During the several hundred years of Chinese rule, sinicization of the newly conquered Nanyue was brought about by a combination of Han imperial military power, regular settlement and an influx of Han Chinese refugees, officers and garrisons, merchants, scholars, bureaucrats, fugitives, and prisoners of war. At the same time, Chinese officials were interested in exploiting the region's natural resources and trade potential. In addition, Han Chinese officials forcibly expropriated fertile land conquered from Vietnamese nobles to be redistributed for newly settled Han Chinese immigrants. Han rule and government administration brought new influences to the indigenous Vietnamese and Vietnam as a Chinese province operated as a frontier outpost of the Han Empire. The Han dynasty wanted to extend their control over the fertile Red River Delta, in part as the geographical terrain served as a convenient supply point and trading post for Han ships engaged in the growing maritime trade with various South and Southeast Asian Kingdoms and the Roman Empire. The Han dynasty relied heavily on trade with the Nanyue who produced unique items such as: bronze and pottery incense burners, ivory, and rhinoceros horns. The Han dynasty took advantage of the Yue people's goods and used them in their maritime trade network that extended from Lingnan through Yunnan to Burma and India.

During the first century of Chinese rule, Vietnam was governed leniently and indirectly with no immediate change in indigenous policies. Initially, the indigenous Lac Viet people were governed at the local level but with indigenous Vietnamese local officials being replaced with newly settled Han Chinese officials. Han imperial bureaucrats generally pursued a policy of peaceful relations with the indigenous Yue population, focusing their administrative roles in the prefectural headquarters and garrisons, and maintaining secure river routes for trade. By the first century AD, however, the Han dynasty intensified its efforts to assimilate its new territories by raising taxes and instituting marriage and land inheritance reforms aimed at turning Vietnam into a patriarchal society more amenable to political authority.

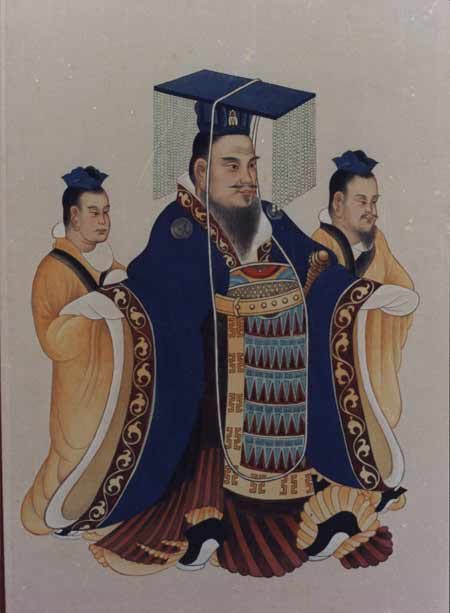
In 111 BC, Emperor Han Wudi successfully conquered Nanyue and annexed it into the Han empire.

The native Luo chief paid heavy tributes and imperial taxes to the Han mandarins to maintain the local administration and the military. The Chinese vigorously tried to assimilate the Vietnamese either through forced signification or through brute Chinese political domination. The Han government sought to assimilate the Vietnamese into the dynasty exhibited through a "civilizing mission" in their maintenance of a unified cohesive empire.

Some Vietnamese welcomed the chance to assimilate as they considered Chinese culture to be a more civilized, advanced, and superior culture. Though the Vietnamese incorporated advanced and technical elements they thought would be beneficial to themselves, the general unwillingness to be dominated by outsiders, the desire to maintain political autonomy, and the drive to regain Vietnamese independence signified Vietnamese resistance and hostility to Chinese aggression, political domination and imperialism on Vietnamese society. Han Chinese bureaucrats sought to impose Chinese high culture onto the indigenous Vietnamese including bureaucratic Legalist techniques and Confucian ethics, education, art, literature, and language. The conquered and subjugated Vietnamese had to adopt the Chinese writing system, Confucianism, and veneration of the Chinese emperor to the detriment of their native spoken language, culture, ethnicity, and national identity.

=== Historiography ===
The characterization of this period of Vietnamese history by national historiography as a "militant, nationalistic, and very contemporary vision" has been described as the nationalist school of Vietnamese history. This portrayal has its roots in Dai Viet but scholars such as Nhi Hoang Thuc Nguyen argue that "the trope of a small country consistently repelling the China's cultural force is a recent, postcolonial, mid-20th-century construction". Other works since have repeated the same elements of the national school by retroactively assigning Vietnamese group consciousness to past periods (Han-Tang era) based on evidence in later eras. The national school of Vietnamese history has remained practically unchanged since the 1980s and has become the national orthodoxy.

The argument for an intrinsic, intractable, and distinctly Southeast Asian Vietnamese identity proposes that there was an intrinsic Vietnamese "cultural core" that has always existed in the Red River Plain and that they resisted foreign aggressors in a national struggle. This characterizes Vietnamese history under Chinese rule as a "steadfast popular resistance marked by armed insurrections against foreign domination". However some scholars such as Churchman note that this lacked evidence. The Vietnamese national narrative has introduced anachronisms in order to prove a unified Vietnamese national consciousness. The word Viet/Yue is often used to refer to an ethnic group when it had various meanings throughout history. There was no terminology to describe a Chinese-Vietnamese dichotomy during the Han-Tang period nor was there a term to describe a cohesive group inhabiting the area between the Pearl River and the Red River. The indigenous people of the area of modern Vietnam ruled by the Chinese did not have a specific name during this period and were referred to as the Wild Man (Wild Barbarians), the Li, or the Annamese (Annan people) by the time of the Tang dynasty. The national history tends to have a narrow view limited to modern national boundaries, leading to conclusions of exceptionalism. Although it is true that the political situation in the Red River Plain was less stable than in Guangzhou to the north, such circumstances were not restricted to the area. The Vietnamese national narrative retroactively assigns any local rebellions, the rise of local dynasties, and their local autonomy with the motive of seeking national independence. These early moves toward autonomy in the 10th century were fairly tame compared to the activities of people who cushioned them from more direct contact with Southern dynasties empires.

== Administration ==
In 111 BC, the Han dynasty defeated the successors of Zhao Tuo and annexed Nanyue and the former Âu Lạc into the Han empire. Following annexation, the name of Jiaozhi (Giao Chỉ) was established, dividing the former kingdom into nine commanderies with the last three commonly used in modern Vietnamese history books:

1. Nanhai (南海; Vietnamese: Nam Hải; located in Lingnan, modern central Guangdong)
2. Hepu (合浦; Vietnamese: Hợp Phố; located in Lingnan, modern southern coastal Guangxi)
3. Cangwu (蒼梧; Vietnamese: Thương Ngô; located in Lingnan, modern eastern Guangxi)
4. Yulin (郁林/鬱林; Vietnamese: Uất Lâm; located in Lingnan, modern Guangxi)
5. Zhuya (珠崖; Vietnamese: Châu Nhai; located on Hainan)
6. Dan'er (儋耳; Vietnamese: Đạm Nhĩ; located on Hainan),
7. Jiaozhi (交趾; Vietnamese: Giao Chỉ; located in northern Vietnam and part of southern Guangxi)
8. Jiuzhen (九真; Vietnamese: Cửu Chân; located in central Vietnam)
9. Rinan (日南; Vietnamese: Nhật Nam; located in central Vietnam)

All nine districts were administered from Long Biên, near modern Hanoi; each was ruled by a Chinese mandarin while the old system of lower rank rulers of Lac Hau, Lac Tuong were kept unchanged.

=== Population ===
Population censuses in 2 AD in modern-day Northern Vietnam are shown as below.

Commandery	Households	Population
Jiaozhi	92,440	746,237
Jiuzhen	35,743	166,013
Rinan	15,460	69,485
Total	143,643	981,755

== Governors ==
Governors or taishou (太守) along with inspectors (cishi 刺史) were the ruler-administrators of Han dynasty commanderies. The first taishous were former commanders of Nanyue under the inspectors' supervision. The recorded cishis and taishous were:

- Thạch Đái (111 BC-?)
- Chu Chương — appointed by Emperor Zhao of Han
- Ích Cư Xương (? – 54 BC)
- Đặng Nhượng (鄧讓) (ruled independently during Wang Mang's usurpation)
- Tích Quang (錫光) — taishou, appointed by Emperor Ping of Han. Consolidated Han rule in Jiaozhi.
- Nhâm Diên (壬延) — taishou of Jiuzhen, appointed by Emperor Guangwu of Han
- Tô Định (蘇定) (30–40 AD) — brutal rule resulted in the Trưng sisters' rebellion

== See also ==
- Timeline of Vietnam under Chinese rule
- Vietnam under Chinese rule

== Sources ==
- Anderson, David (2004). The Columbia Guide to the Vietnam War. Columbia University Press. ISBN 978-0231114936.
- Anderson, David (2005). The Vietnam War (Twentieth Century Wars). Palgrave. ISBN 978-0333963371.
- Anderson, James A. (2013). "Distinguishing Between China and Vietnam: Three Relational Equilibriums in Sino-Vietnamese Relations" (PDF). Journal of East Asian Studies. 13 (2). Cambridge: Cambridge University Press: 259–280. doi:10.1017/S1598240800003933. S2CID 155599974.
- Bielestein, Hans (1986), "Wang Mang, the restoration of the Han dynasty, and Later Han", in Twitchett, Denis C.; Fairbank, John King (eds.), The Cambridge History of China: Volume 1, The Ch'in and Han Empires, 221 BC-AD 220, Cambridge: Cambridge University Press, pp. 223–290
- Brindley, Erica (2011). "Representations and Uses of Yue Identity along the Southern Frontier of the Han, CA. 200–111 B.C.E.". Early China. 33. Society for the Study of Early China: 1–35. doi:10.1017/S0362502800000225. S2CID 157162042.
- Bowman, John Stewart (2000). Columbia Chronologies of Asian History and Culture. Columbia University Press. ISBN 978-0231110044.
- Churchman, Catherine (2016). The People Between the Rivers: The Rise and Fall of a Bronze Drum Culture, 200–750 CE. Rowman & Littlefield Publishers. ISBN 978-1-442-25861-7.
- Cima, Ronald J. (1987). Vietnam: A Country Study. United States Library of Congress. ISBN 978-0160181436.
- Di Cosmo, Nicola (2011). "Han Frontiers: Toward an Integrated View". Journal of the American Oriental Society. 129 (2). Society for the Study of Early China: 199–214. ISSN 0003-0279. JSTOR 40593813.
- Ebrey, Patricia; Walthall, Anne (2013). "The Founding of the Bureaucratic Empire: Qin-Han China (256 B.C.E. – 200 C.E.)". In Ebrey, Patricia B.; Walthall, Anne (eds.). East Asia: A Cultural, Social, and Political History (3rd ed.). Boston: Cengage Learning. pp. 36–60. ISBN 978-1133606475.
- Hyunh, Kim Khanh (1986). Vietnamese Communism, 1925-1945. Cornell University Press. ISBN 978-0801493973.
- Lary, Diana (1996). "The Tomb of the King of Nanyue-The Contemporary Agenda of History: Scholarship and Identity". Modern China. 22 (1). Sage Publications, Inc.: 3–27. doi:10.1177/009770049602200101. ISSN 0097-7004. JSTOR 189288. S2CID 143871496.
- Loewe, Michael (1986), "The conduct of government and the issues at stake (A.D. 57-167)", in Twitchett, Denis C.; Fairbank, John King (eds.), The Cambridge History of China: Volume 1, The Ch'in and Han Empires, 221 BC-AD 220, Cambridge: Cambridge University Press, pp. 291–316
- Largo, V. (2002). Vietnam: Current Issues and Historical Background. Nova Science. ISBN 978-1590333686.
- McLeod, Mark; Nguyen, Thi Dieu (2001). Culture and Customs of Vietnam. Greenwood. ISBN 978-0313361135.
- Miksic, John Norman; Yian, Goh Geok (2016). Ancient Southeast Asia. Routledge. ISBN 978-0415735544.
- Morton, W. Scott; Lewis, Charlton M. (2004). China: Its History and Culture (4th ed.). New York: McGraw-Hill. ISBN 0-07-141279-4.
- Murphey, Rhoads (1997). East Asia: A New History. Pearson. ISBN 978-0205695225.
- Reid, Anthony; Tran, Nhung Tuyet (2006). Viet Nam: Borderless Histories. University of Wisconsin Press. ISBN 978-1-316-44504-4.
- Schafer, Edward Hetzel (1967), The Vermilion Bird: T'ang Images of the South, Los Angeles: University of California Press
- Stark, Miriam T. (August 26, 2005). Archaeology of Asia. Wiley. ISBN 978-1405102131.
- Suryadinata, Leo (1997). Ethnic Chinese As Southeast Asians. Institute of Southeast Asian Studies.
- Taylor, Keith Weller (1983), The Birth of the Vietnam, University of California Press, ISBN 9780520074170
- Tucker, Spencer (1999). Vietnam. University of Kentucky Press. ISBN 978-0813121215.
- Yu, Ying-shih (1986), "Han foreign relations", in Twitchett, Denis C.; Fairbank, John King (eds.), The Cambridge History of China: Volume 1, The Ch'in and Han Empires, 221 BC-AD 220, Cambridge: Cambridge University Press, pp. 377–463

Preceded by Nanyue	First Chinese domination of Vietnam; 111 BC – 40 AD	Succeeded by Trưng Sisters
