= Jiaozhou (region) =

Imperial Chinese province

Coordinates: 21°01′N 105°51′E

Chinese name
- Traditional Chinese: 交州
- Simplified Chinese: 交州
Transcriptions
Standard Mandarin
- Hanyu Pinyin: Jiāozhōu
- Wade–Giles: Chiao^{1}-cho^{1}

Vietnamese name
- Vietnamese alphabet: Giao Châu
- Chữ Hán: 交州

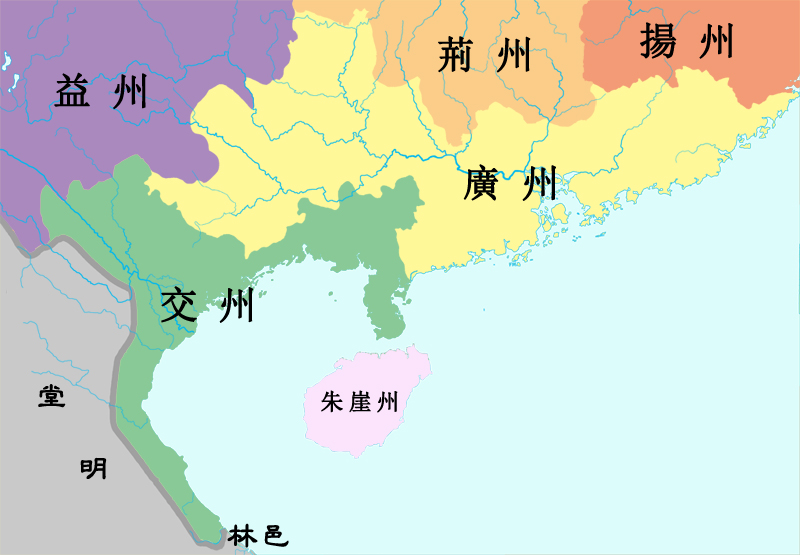
Location and territory of Jiaozhou (green)

History of Vietnam
(by names of Vietnam)
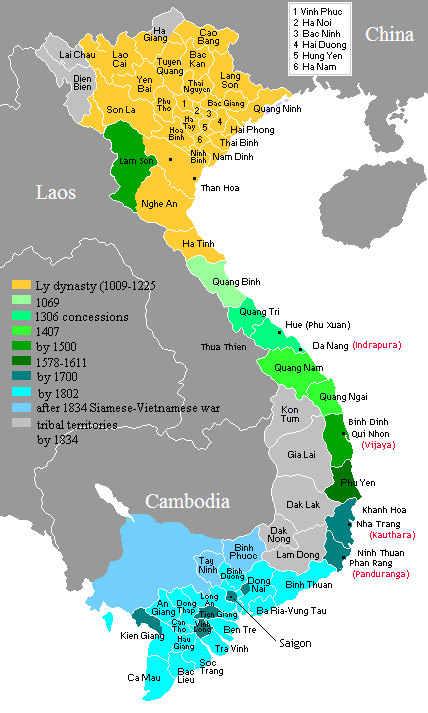

~2879–2524 BC	Xích Quỷ (Note: legendary)
~700–258 BC	Văn Lang
257–179 BC	Âu Lạc
204–111 BC	Nam Việt
111 BC – 40 AD	Giao Chỉ
40–43	Lĩnh Nam
43–203	Giao Chỉ
203–544	Giao Châu
544–602	Vạn Xuân
602–679	Giao Châu
679–757	An Nam
757–766	Trấn Nam
766–866	An Nam
866–968	Tĩnh Hải quân
968–1054	Đại Cồ Việt
1054–1400	Đại Việt
1400–1407	Đại Ngu
1407–1427	Giao Chỉ
1428–1804	Đại Việt
1804–1839	Việt Nam
1839–1945	Đại Nam
1887–1954	Đông Dương
1945–	Việt Nam
Main template
History of Vietnam

Jiaozhou (Chinese: 交州; Wade–Giles: Chiao^{1}-Cho^{1}; Vietnamese: Giao Châu) was an imperial Chinese province under the Han, Eastern Wu, and Jin dynasties. Under the Han, the area included present-day Liangguang and northern Vietnam but during the 3rd century, the province of Guangzhou was later separated by Sun Quan following the death of Shi Xie and lasted until the creation of the Annan Protectorate in 679.

== History ==
=== Han dynasty ===
In 111 BC, the armies of Emperor Wu conquered the rebel state of Nanyue and organized the area as the circuit (部 bù) of Jiaozhi, under the rule of a cishi (zh:刺史 (cìshǐ) vi:thứ sử). In addition to six original commanderies (Nanhai, Hepu, Cangwu, Yulin, Jiaozhi and Jiuzhen), the Han Empire conquered new territories on Hainan as well as in the area south of the Ngang Pass and established them as the commanderies of Zhuya, Dan'er, and Rinan. In 203 CE, Jiaozhi circuit (交趾部 Jiāozhǐ bù) was raised to a zhou or province, under the name Jiaozhou (交州 Jiāozhōu).

=== Eastern Wu ===
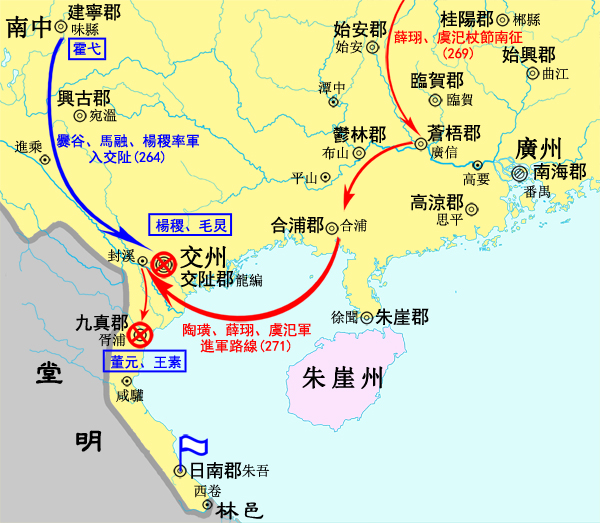
Jin-Wu war 264-272

Following the death of Shi Xie in 226 CE, Eastern Wu divided Jiaozhou into Guangzhou and the new Jiaozhou. However, after suppressing Shi Hui (士徽), son of Shi Xie, Eastern Wu re-annexed Guangzhou into Jiaozhou. It was only in 264 CE that Jiaozhou was re-divided: Guangzhou was composed of three commanderies of Nanhai, Cangwu and Yulin while the new Jiaozhou was composed of four commanderies of Hepu, Jiaozhi, Jiuzhen and Rinan. Also in the same year, a Roman envoy arrived in Jiaozhi of Jiaozhou and was hastened to the Wu court. In 229, Eastern Wu sent embassy to Funan, where merchants from India and beyond gathered.

The Wu regime was harsh. Turmoil plagued the southern commanderies by the mid third century. In 231, Lac Viet people in Jiuzhen revolted but was "pacified" by a Wu general. In 248, Lâm Ấp forces invaded from the south, seized most of Rinan, and marched on into Jiuzhen, provoking major uprisings there and in Jiaozhi. One Jiaozhi rebel commanded thousands and invested several walled towns before Wu officials got him to surrender.

In Jiuzhen, a Lạc Việt woman named Triệu Ẩu (Lady Triệu) led a rebellion against the Wu in 248, but was suppressed by Lu Yin.

In 263, "Yue barbarians" in Jiaozhi and Jiuzhen under Lã Hưng revolted against the Wu dynasty. The rebels handed the region over to Wu's rival, the northern Chinese kingdom of Jin. In 268 and 269, they held off large Wu armies and fleets, which eventually retook Jiaozhi's ports and main towns in 271. Fighting continued in the countryside until 280, when Jin destroyed Wu, reunifying China.

=== Jin dynasty ===
In the early period of Jin dynasty, the imperial court favored the southern trade networks with prosperity kingdoms of Funan and Lâm Ấp. Along with this brief peacetime “boom” in the southern trade, Jiaozhi and Jiuzhen enjoyed some autonomy from China until the 320s. In 312 rebels and imperial units fought each other with ferocity over Jiaozhi and Jiuzhen. Frustrated by the difficulty of trade, Lâm Ấp itself resorted from 323 to seaborne raids on northern ports in Jiaozhou. Though defeated in 399, Lâm Ấp continued its raids on Jiaozhi and Jiuzhen for two decades. A Chinese rebel army from Zhejiang briefly seized Jiaozhi's capital in 411.

During the Jin dynasty and Six dynasties period of China, the Li-Lao people extended their territories right along the south coast of modern Guangdong and Guangxi, in a swath of land to the east of the Red River Delta and south and west of the Pearl River Delta, occupied the overland roads between Guangzhou and Jiaozhou. The people of Li-Lao country put anyone traveled through their territories in dangers.

=== Southern dynasties ===
In 446, Liu Song dynasty invaded Lâm Ấp, captured Lâm Ấp's capital (near modern Huế). The Chinese attackers plundered its eight temples and treasury, carrying off 100,000 pounds of gold. Despite that, the revived Lâm Ấp was flourishing on the ever more lucrative passing sea trade.

Rebellions broke out in Jiaozhou from 468 to 485, and in 506 and 515 under Liang dynasty.

=== Vạn Xuân kingdom ===
In 541, Lý Bôn, a leader of the local Lý clan revolted against the Liang. In 544 he defeated the Liang and proclaimed himself Emperor of Nán Yuè with reign era Thiên-đức. Jiaozhou briefly became independence from the Chinese dynasties. In 545, Chen Baxian led the Liang army attack Jiaozhou, forced Lý Bôn fled west into the mountains above the Red River, where he was killed by Lao highlanders in 548. However even after Lý Bôn's death, Jiaozhou remained autonomous. In 583, Lý Hữu Vinh, a local leader of Jiaozhou sent a trained elephant to the Chen court.

Around 589-590 Lý Xuân (Lý Phật Tử) became the leader of Vạn Xuân. As the authority of Sui gradually consolidated in southern China, Lý Phật Tử recognized Sui overlordship. In 601, governor of Guangzhou, Ling-hu Hsi forwarded an imperial summons for Phật Tử to appear at the Sui capital. Resolved to resist this demand, Phật Tử sought delay by requesting that the summons be postponed until after the new year. Hsi approved the request, believing that he could keep Phật Tử's allegiance by exercising restraint. Someone, however, accused Hsi of taking a bribe from Phật Tử, and the court grew suspicious. When Phật Tử openly rebelled early in 602, Hsi was promptly arrested; he died en route north. This caused the Sui court called general Liu Fang to command 27,000 troops attacked Lý Phật Tử from Yunnan in 602. At Đỗ Long Pass, on the watershed between the Hsi and Chảy Rivers, Fang met two thousand of Phật Tử's men. Brushing aside this unsuspecting frontier garrison, Fang descended the Chay River and penetrated into the heart of Phật Tử's realm. Unprepared to resist an assault from such an unexpected quarter, Phật Tử heeded Fang's admonition to surrender and was sent to the Sui capital at Chang'an. Lý Phật Tử and his subordinates were beheaded to preclude future trouble. This marked the Third Chinese domination of Vietnam.

=== Sui and Tang dynasty ===
In 622, the rebel Xiao Xian was defeated by the Tang and the Chinese warlord in Jiaozhou, Qiu He, submitted to the Tang dynasty.

In 679, Protectorate General to Pacify the South (Annam) was created and replaced the Jiaozhou protectorate.

=== Ming dynasty ===
The name "Jiaozhi" was revived for the province encompassing northern Vietnam in the Ming dynasty.

== See also ==
- First and Second Chinese domination of Vietnam

== Sources ==
- Taylor, Keith Weller (1983). The Birth of the Vietnam. University of California Press. ISBN 978-0-520-07417-0.
- Kiernan, Ben (2019). Việt Nam: a history from earliest time to the present. Oxford University Press. ISBN 9780190053796.
- Loewe, Michael (1986), "The conduct of government and the issues at stake (A.D. 57-167)", in Twitchett, Denis C.; Fairbank, John King (eds.), The Cambridge History of China: Volume 1, The Ch'in and Han Empires, 221 BC-AD 220, Cambridge: Cambridge University Press, pp. 291–316
- Li, Tana (2011), "Jiaozhi (Giao Chỉ) in the Han Period Tongking Gulf", in Li, Tana; Anderson, James A. (eds.), The Tongking Gulf Through History, Pennsylvania: University of Pennsylvania Press, pp. 39–53, ISBN 978-0-812-20502-2
- Churchman, Michael (2011), ""The People in Between": The Li and the Lao from the Han to the Sui", in Li, Tana; Anderson, James A. (eds.), The Tongking Gulf Through History, Pennsylvania: University of Pennsylvania Press, pp. 67–86, ISBN 978-0-812-20502-2
