= Han conquest of Nanyue =

111 BC military conflict

- Part of the southward expansion of the Han dynasty
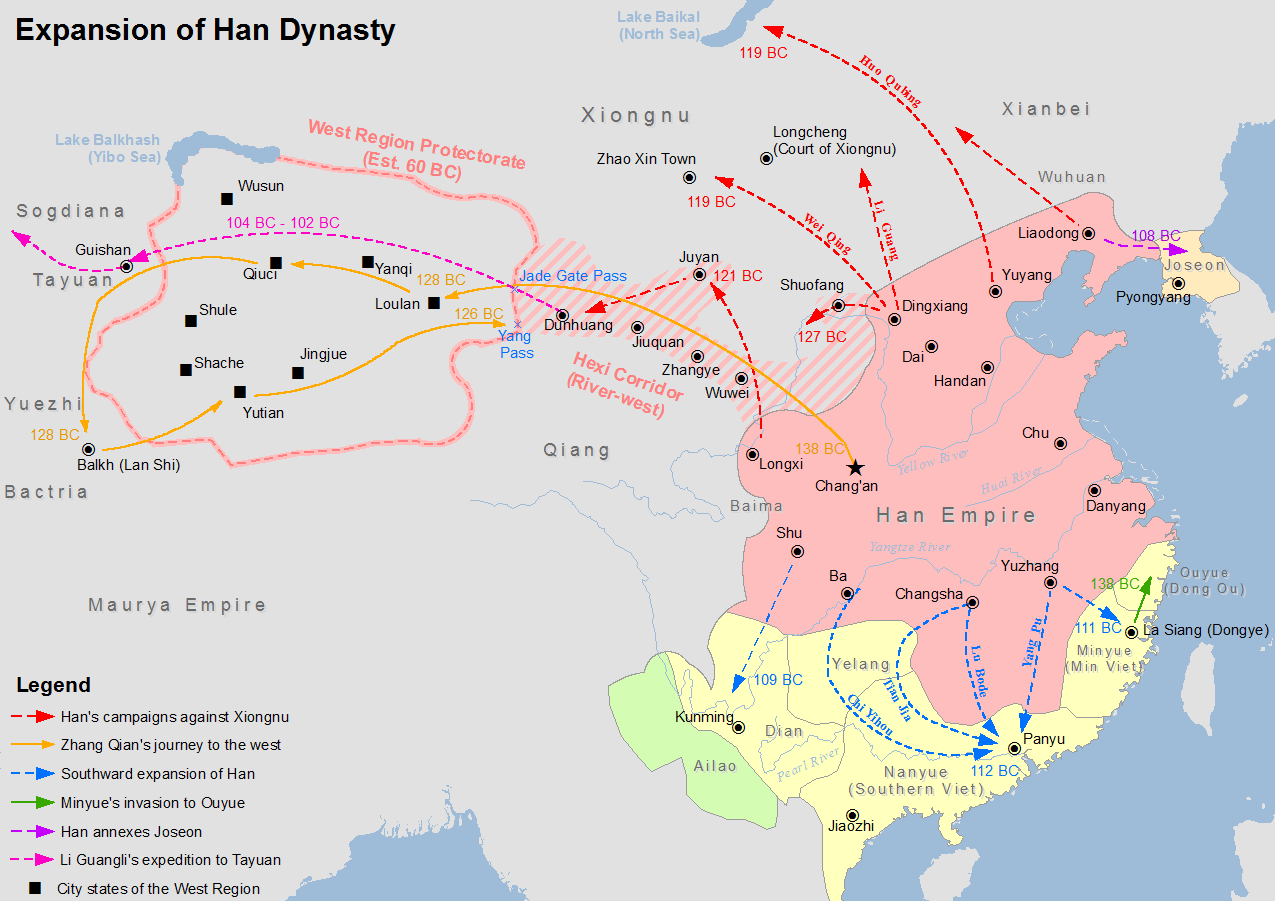
- Expansion of the Han dynasty in the 2nd century BC
Date	111 BC
Location	Guangdong, Guangxi, North Vietnam
Result	Han victory
Territorial changes	Nanyue annexed by the Han; Beginning of the First Era of Northern Domination in Vietnam

Belligerents
Han dynasty	Nanyue

Commanders and leaders
Lu Bode; Yang Pu; Zou Yao; Gang Lianghou	Zhao Jiande †; Lü Jia †

Strength
100,000	Unknown

The Han conquest of Nanyue was a military conflict between the Han Empire and the Nanyue kingdom in modern Guangdong, Guangxi, and Northern Vietnam. During the reign of Emperor Wu, Imperial Han military forces formally launched a punitive campaign against Nanyue and successfully conquered it in 111 BC.

== Background ==
During the collapse of the Qin dynasty, Zhao Tuo established himself as the King of Nanyue in southern China. Zhao was originally a Qin military officer from Zhending in northern China. The Han frontier in the south was not threatened and there was no indication that Zhao Tuo would encroach on Han territory. In 196 BC, the Emperor Gaozu sent Lu Jia on a diplomatic mission to Nanyue to officially recognize Zhao Tuo as a local ruler. Nevertheless, relations between Han and Nanyue were sometimes strained. Zhao Tuo resented Empress Lü's ban on exports of metal wares and female livestock to Nanyue. In 183 BC, he proclaimed himself the "Martial Emperor of the Southern Yue" (南越武帝), which implied a perceived status on equal footing with the Han emperor. Two years later, Nanyue attacked the Changsha Kingdom, a constituent kingdom of the Han empire. In 180 BC, Lu Jia led a diplomatic mission to Nanyue. During negotiations, he succeeded in convincing Zhao Tuo to give up on his title as emperor and pay homage to Han as a nominal vassal.

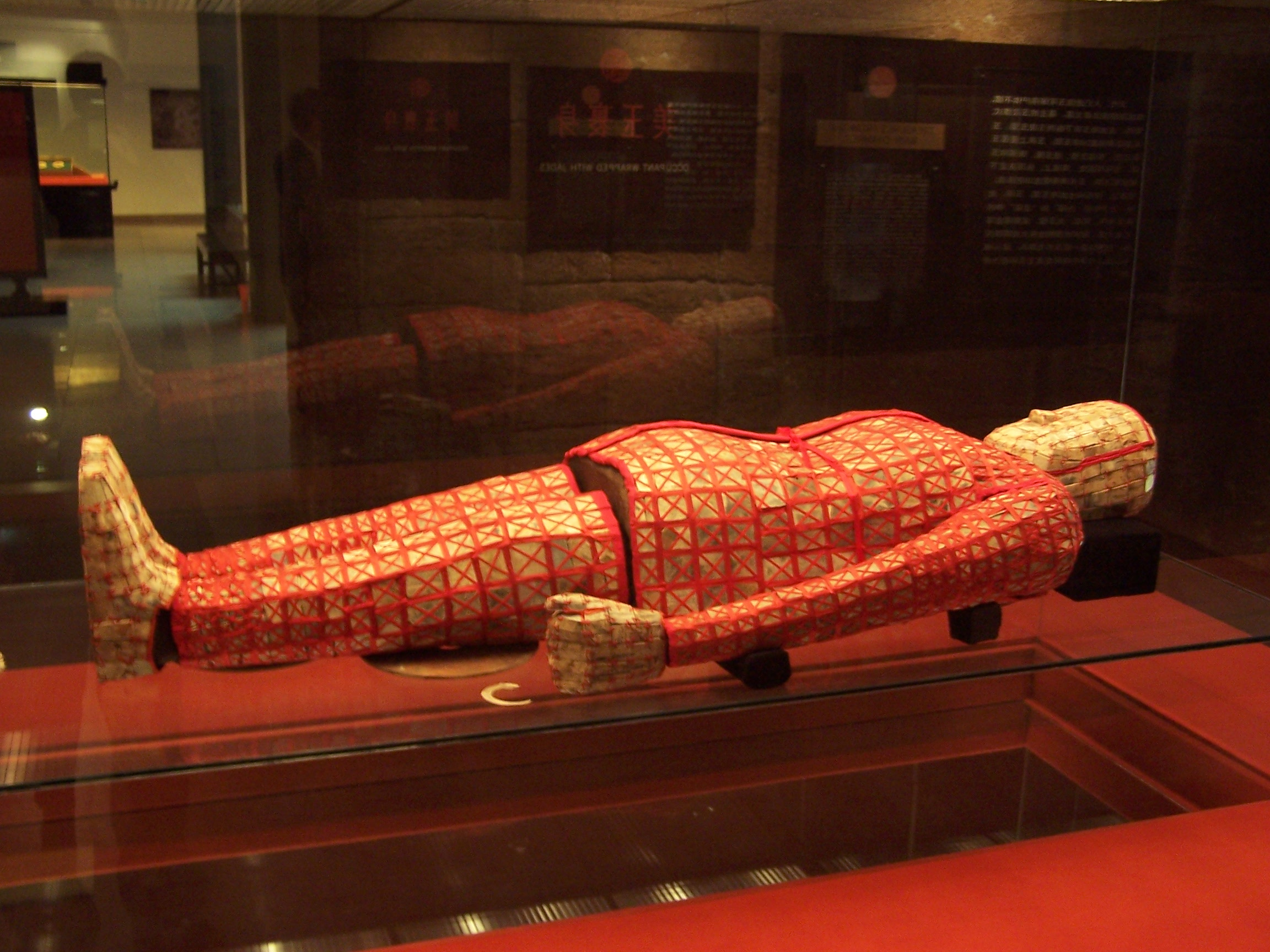
Jade burial suit of King Zhao Mo

In 135 BC, King Zhao Mo of Nanyue appealed to the Han court for help against attacking Minyue forces. The Han court responded swiftly and this led to Zhao Mo's agreement to send his son, Prince Zhao Yingqi, to serve in the palace at Chang'an. Even though Nanyue neglected to pay regular homage to the Han court, the court had its attention focused on other commitments and was not set on forcing the issue.

At the Nanyue court in 113 BC, the Queen Dowager of Nanyue, who was Han Chinese stock and married to Zhao Yingqi, suggested incorporating Nanyue as a kingdom under the suzerainty of the Han empire. At the same time, the Queen Dowager sent a letter to Emperor Wu of Han through an envoy, requesting that she be allowed to go to Chang'an to pay homage to the Han Emperor every three years, just like the internal princes of the Han dynasty, and that the border checkpoints on the border between Nanyue and Han be removed. Emperor Wu agreed to Queen Dowager's request and granted official seals to the senior officials of Nanyue. Han laws also began to be implemented in Nanyue. This formally integrated Nanyue on the same terms as the other constituent kingdoms of the Han empire.

However, many Nanyue ministers opposed unification with the Han dynasty. Lü Jia was the primary Nanyue official to oppose the idea and he led the opposition against the Queen Dowager. In 112 BC, the opposition retaliated violently and executed the Queen Dowager, a provocation that led to the mobilization of a large Han naval force into Nanyue.

== Course ==
The Han forces comprised six armies, who traveled by sea, directly southward, or from Sichuan along the Xi River. In 111 BC, General Lu Bode and General Yang Pu advanced towards Panyu (present-day Guangzhou). This resulted in the surrender of Nanyue to the Han empire later that year.

== Aftermath ==
Following the conquest of Nanyue in 111 BC, the Han empire established nine new commanderies to administer the former Nanyue territories. The Han government proceeded to extend its imperial control expand further southwestward by military means after the conquest. Following the conquest, the Han empire gradually extended its overseas trade with the various polities in Southeast Asia and around the Indian Ocean.

In Nanyue, the Han dynasty established nine commanderies:

- Nanhai (Nam Hải, now Guangdong province, China)
- Cangwu (Thương Ngô, now part of Guangxi province, China)
- Yulin (Uất Lâm, now part of Guangxi province, China)
- Hepu (Hợp Phố, now southern Guangxi and southwestern Guangdong)
- Zhuya (Chu Nhai, now part of Hainan Island)
- Dan'er (Đạm Nhĩ, now part of Hainan Island)
- Jiaozhi (Giao Chỉ, now Northern Vietnam and eastern Guangxi)
- Jiuzhen (Cửu Chân, now the three provinces of Thanh Hóa, Nghệ An, and Hà Tĩnh)
- Rinan (Nhật Nam, from Ngang Pass to Quảng Nam)

== See also ==
- Qin campaign against the Yue tribes

== Literature ==
- Loewe, Michael (1986). "The Former Han Dynasty". In Twitchett, Dennis; Loewe, Michael (eds.). The Cambridge History of China, Volume 1: The Ch'in and Han Empires, 221 BC–AD 220. Cambridge: Cambridge University Press. ISBN 978-0-521-24327-8.
- Loewe, Michael (1986). "The Structure and Practice of Government". In Twitchett, Dennis; Loewe, Michael (eds.). The Cambridge History of China, Volume 1: The Ch'in and Han Empires, 221 BC–AD 220. Cambridge: Cambridge University Press. ISBN 978-0-521-24327-8.
- Morton, W. Scott; Lewis, Charlton M. (2004). China: Its History and Culture (4th ed.). New York: McGraw-Hill. ISBN 0-07-141279-4.
- Yü, Ying-shih (1986). "Han Foreign Relations". In Twitchett, Dennis; Loewe, Michael (eds.). The Cambridge History of China, Volume 1: The Ch'in and Han Empires, 221 BC–AD 220. Cambridge: Cambridge University Press. ISBN 978-0-521-24327-8.
- 張榮芳; 黃淼章 (2008). 南越国史 (in Chinese) (2nd ed.). 廣東人民出版社. ISBN 978-7-218-01982-6.
