= Lady Triệu =

3rd-century Vietnamese warrior

- Triệu Ẩu (趙嫗); Bà Triệu (婆趙)
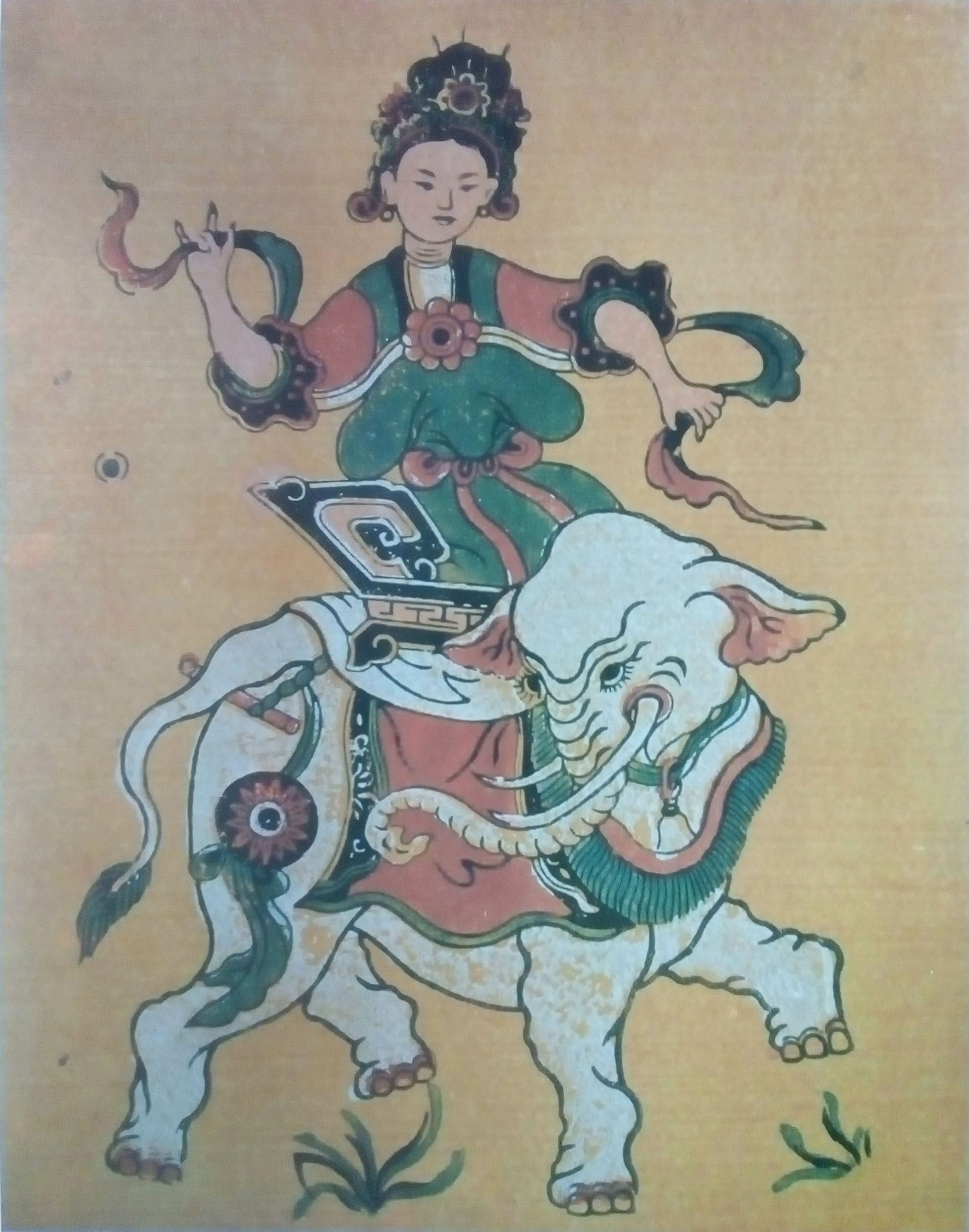
- Đông Hồ painting depiction of Lady Triệu
- Born: November 8th, 226 AD; Yên Định District, Cửu Chân, Giao Châu
- Died: 248 AD (aged 21 or 23); Hậu Lộc District, Cửu Chân, Giao Châu
- Burial place: Unknown (Attributed to Tùng mountain (Triệu Lộc Commune, Hậu Lộc District, today Thanh Hóa province, Vietnam))

Lady Triệu

Vietnamese name
- Vietnamese alphabet: Bà Triệu; Triệu Ẩu
- Chữ Hán: 趙嫗
- Chữ Nôm: 婆趙

Lady Triệu (Vietnamese: Bà Triệu, [ɓà ʈ͡ʂiə̂ˀw], Chữ Nôm: 婆趙, died 248 AD) or Triệu Ẩu ([ʈ͡ʂiə̂ˀw ʌ̂u], Chữ Hán: 趙嫗) was a female warrior in 3rd-century Vietnam who managed, for a time, to resist the rule of the Chinese Eastern Wu dynasty. She is also called Triệu Thị Trinh, although her actual given name is unknown.

The uprising of Lady Triệu is usually depicted in modern Vietnamese National History as one of many chapters constituting a "long national independence struggle to end foreign domination." She is also known as Lệ Hải Bà Vương (chữ Hán: 麗海婆王, lit. "beautiful sea's lady king"). She is quoted as saying, "I want to ride storms, slay orcas in the open sea, drive out the aggressors, reconquer the country and undo the ties of serfdom, not to bend my back to be the concubine of whatever man."

== Background ==
In 226, Sun Quan sent 3,000 troops to reassert direct Chinese control over Jiaozhi and also to eradicate Shi Xie's family. Sun Quan's forces, under Lü Dai, captured and beheaded Shi Hui along with all of his family, then stormed Jiuzhen and killed ten thousand people there, along with surviving members of Shi Xie's family. Sun Quan divided Jiaozhi into two separated provinces, Jiaozhou and Guangzhou. In 231, Eastern Wu again sent a general to Jiuzhen to "exterminate and pacify the barbarous Yue tribes."

== Biography ==
In 248, the people of Jiaozhi and Jiuzhen districts of Jiao province rebelled against the Wu Chinese. A local woman named Triệu Ẩu in Jiuzhen led the rebellion, followed by a hundred chieftains who led fifty thousand families in her revolt. Eastern Wu sent Lu Yin to deal with the rebels, and put Lady Trieu to death after several months of warfare. Keith Taylor wrote in 1983: "Although Chinese records did not mention Lady Trieu, she was described by Le Tac, a 13th-century Vietnamese scholar exiled in Yuan China in his Annan zhilue as a woman who had a yard-long breast and fought on an elephant in battle." K. W. Taylor argued that "the resistance of Lady Trieu was for them (Chinese) simply a kind of stubborn barbarism that was wiped out as a matter of course and was of no historical interest." Catherine Churchman (2016) indicates that Taylor is mistaken about Chinese records not mentioning her. According to Churchman, the oldest and also most detailed record of Lady Trieu came from a chronicle called Jiaozhou ji (交州記) of Liu Xinqi (written during the Western Jin dynasty (265–318)), and was quoted in the Taiping Yulan (c. 980), which was the source text for all subsequent accounts.

== Jin conquest of Jiaozhou ==
In 263, Lü Xing (呂興), a prefecture official in Jiaozhou, revolted with support from local people and soldiers, murdering Wu administrators Sun Xu (孫諝) and Deng Xun (鄧荀), then sent envoys to Cao Wei to request military assistance. Jiaozhi, Jiuzhen and Rinan were transferred to Wei control. In February 266, Western Jin replaced Cao Wei and immediately sent Yang Chi to annex Jiaozhou with local support. In 268, Eastern Wu dispatched two generals, Liu Jun and Xiu Ze to reconquer Jiaozhou from the Jin, but were defeated by Jin armies. In 270, Jin and Wu armies clashed in Hepu Commandery, Guangxi. The Wu general, Tao Huang, managed to get contact with Luong Ky, a local commander of the Fuyan barbarians (扶嚴夷) who was collaborating with the Jin, and convinced him to switch side to the Wu, enabling the Wu army to recapture Jiaozhi's ports and main towns in 271. Fighting continued in the countryside until 280, when the Jin dynasty finally destroyed Eastern Wu, reunifying China.

== Vietnamese account ==
=== Traditional ===
Đại Việt sử ký toàn thư (大越史記全書 Complete annals of Great Viet), written during the Lê dynasty, said the following about Lady Trieu:

The Mậu Thìn year, [248], (11th year of Emperor Diên Hy of Han (Han Yanxi 漢延熙); 11th year of Xích Ô (Chiwu 赤烏)). The people of Cửu Chân (Jiuzhen 九真) again attacked citadels, the prefecture was in rebellion. The Wu king appointed the Hành Dương Imperial Secretist Lục Dận [Lu Yin] (some sources said Lục Thương [Lu Shang]) to Inspectorship of Jiaozhou. Dận arrived, used the people's respect for him to call them to lay down arms, people surrendered, numbering more than 30,000 households, and the prefecture was once again peaceful. Afterwards, a woman from the Cửu Chân commandery named Triệu Ẩu assembled people and attacked several commanderies (Ẩu has breasts 3 thước [1.2 m] long, tied them behind her back, often rides elephants to fight). Dận was able to subdue [her]. (Giao Chỉ records only write: In the mountains of Cửu Chân commandery there was a young woman surnamed Triệu, with breasts 3 thước long, unmarried, assembled people and robbed the commanderies, often wore gilded coarse tunics and toothed footwears (or toothed footwears made from gilded coarse clothes?), and fought while sitting on an elephant's head, after she died she became an immortal).

=== Modern ===
Việt Nam sử lược (A Brief History of Vietnam), written in the early 20th century by Vietnamese historian Trần Trọng Kim, said the following about Lady Trieu:

In this year on Cửu Chân prefecture, there was a woman named Triệu Thị Chinh (Note: The use of the name Triệu Thị Chinh is in this book. This is not a spelling mistake. In addition, the word Chinh /ciŋ˧˧/ is pronounced like Trinh /ʈiŋ˧˧/ as [t͡ɕïŋ˧˧] in some Vietnamese dialects (e.g. Hanoi).) who organized a revolt against the Wu.

Our [Vietnamese] history recorded that lady Trieu was a people of Nông Cống district. Her parents were dead all when she was a child, she lived with her older brother Trieu Quoc Dat. At the age of 20, while she was living with her sister-in-law who was a cruel woman, she [Trieu Thi Trinh] killed her sister[-in-law] and went to the mountain. She was a strong, brave and smart person. On the mountain, she gathered a band of 1,000 followers. Her brother tried to persuade her from rebelling, she told him: "I only want to ride the wind and walk the waves, slay the big whales of the Eastern sea, clean up frontiers, and save the people from drowning. Why should I imitate others, bow my head, stoop over and be a slave? Why resign myself to menial housework?".

The Mậu Thìn year, [248], because of the cruelty of Wu mandarins and misery of people, Trieu Quoc Dang revolted in Cửu Chân prefecture. Lady Trieu led her troops joined her brother's rebellion, soldiers of Trieu Quoc Dat made her leader because of her braveness. When she went to battles, she usually wore yellow tunics and rode a war-elephant. She proclaimed herself Nhụy Kiều Tướng quân (The Lady General clad in Golden Robe).

Giao Châu Inspector Lục Dận sent troops to fight [her], she [Trieu Thi Trinh] had managed to fight back the Ngô [Wu] forces for 5 or 6 months. Because of the lack of troops and fighting alone, she [Trieu Thi Trinh] could not manage to fight a long war and was defeated. She fled to Bồ Điền commune (present-day Phú Điền commune, Mỹ Hóa district) and then committed suicide.

Later, the Nam Đế (Southern Emperor) of Early Lý dynasty praised her as a brave and loyal person and ordered [his followers] build her a temple, and gave her the title of "Bật chính anh hùng tài trinh nhất phu nhân" (Most Noble, Heroic and Virgin Lady). Present day in Phú Điền commune, in the Thanh Hóa province there is a temple [for her].

== Other accounts ==
The earliest mention of Trieu Thi Trinh is in the Jiaozhou Ji (交州记) written in the Jin dynasty, and collected in the Taiping Yulan.

In the book Vietnamese Tradition on Trial, 1920-1945 written by David G. Marr, he detailed the story of Trieu Thi Trinh as follows: Trieu Thi Trinh was a 9-foot-tall (2.7 m) woman who had 3-foot-long (0.91 m) breasts. She also had a voice which sounded like a temple bell, and she could eat many rice pecks and walk 500 leagues per day. Moreover, Trinh had a beauty that could shake any man's soul. Because of repeated altercations, she killed her sister-in-law and went to a forest in which she gathered a small army and attacked the Chinese. When her brother tried to persuade her from rebelling, she told him:

I only want to ride the wind and walk the waves, slay the big whales of the Eastern sea, clean up frontiers, and save the people from drowning. Why should I imitate others, bow my head, stoop over and be a slave? Why resign myself to menial housework?

After hearing Trinh's words, her brother decided to join her. At first the Chinese underestimated Trinh for her being a female leader but after some encounters, they feared her because of her gaze. Three centuries later, she still offered spiritual support for male Vietnamese opponents of the Chinese. During the 11th century she was honored by the Ly court with a lot of posthumous titles. During the Lê dynasty, Neo-Confucianism became Vietnam's national ideology and many scholars aggressively tried to bring the practices of Trieu Thi Trinh into conformity with Neo-Confucianism. Nevertheless, she survived all their manipulations.

== Historical differences ==
Most available information comes solely from Vietnamese sources that were written during or after the late Ming dynasty. The Sanguozhi (Records of the Three Kingdoms), a classical Chinese historical account, does mention a rebellion at this time in the commanderies of Jiaozhi (交趾; Vietnamese: Giao Chỉ) and Jiuzhen (九真, Vietnamese: Cửu Chân):

In the 11th year of Chiwu (赤烏) [248] in Jiaozhi (交趾), Jiuzhen (九真) rebels attacked walled cities which caused a great uproar. Lu Yin (陸胤) [of Hengyang (衡陽)] was given rank of the Inspector of Jiaozhou by the Sovereign of Wu. He took his troops and entered the southern border and sent word to the rebels. He used his craftiness to convince them to accept his terms. [In] Gaoliang (高涼), the commander Huang Wu (黄吳) with 3,000 households came out to surrender. Lu Yin now led the army south to that region. He announced his sincerity [to the aborigines] and distributed gifts. The [remaining] 100 rebel leaders and 50,000 households, who had been unruly and unapproachable, kowtowed [to Lu Yin]. Thus the territory was handed over peacefully. At once Lu Yin was given the rank of General who Tranquilizes the South. Again he was sent on a punitive expedition against the rebels in Cangwu (蒼梧). He defeated them quickly. From start to finish Lu Yin's military troops totaled 8,000. (Later commentaries also cited that Lu Yin then helped to plant crops and kept the people fed.)

Keith W. Taylor, an American professor, explained these differences as following:

Chinese records do not mention Lady Trieu; our knowledge of her comes only from Vietnamese sources. From this it is evident that the events of 248 were remembered differently by the two sides. The Chinese only recorded their success in buying off certain rebel leaders with bribes and promises. The resistance led by Lady Trieu was for them simply a kind of stubborn barbarism that was wiped out as a matter of course and was of no historical interest. On the other hand, the Vietnamese remembered Lady Trieu's uprising as the most important event of the time. Her leadership appealed to strong popular instincts. The traditional image of her as a remarkable yet human leader, throwing her yard-long breasts over her shoulders when going into battle astride an elephant, has been handed down from generation to generation. After Lady Trieu's death, her spirit was worshipped by the Vietnamese. We owe our knowledge of her to the fact that she was remembered by the people.

== Notes ==
=== Citations ===
- The Chronicle of the Three Kingdoms (220-265). Chapters 69-78 from the Tzu chih t'ung chien of Ssu-ma Kuang / Translated and Annotated by Achilles Fang; Edited by Glen W. Baxter.

=== Bibliography ===
- Churchman, Catherine (2016). The People Between the Rivers: The Rise and Fall of a Bronze Drum Culture, 200–750 CE. Rowman & Littlefield Publishers. ISBN 978-1-442-25861-7.
- Kiernan, Ben (2019). Việt Nam: a history from earliest time to the present. Oxford University Press.
- Marr, David G. (1984). Vietnamese Tradition on Trial, 1920-1945. University of California Press. ISBN 0-520-05081-9.
- Nguyen, Khac Vien (2002). Vietnam, a Long History. Gioi Publishers.
- Taylor, K. W. (1983). The Birth of Vietnam. University of California Press. ISBN 978-0-520-07417-0.
- Rydstrøm, Helle (2003). Embodying Morality: Growing Up in Rural Northern Vietnam. University of Hawaii Press.
