= Lian Prefecture (Guangxi) =

Historical administrative division in Guangxi, China

Lian Prefecture (廉州) Hepu Commandery (合浦郡)
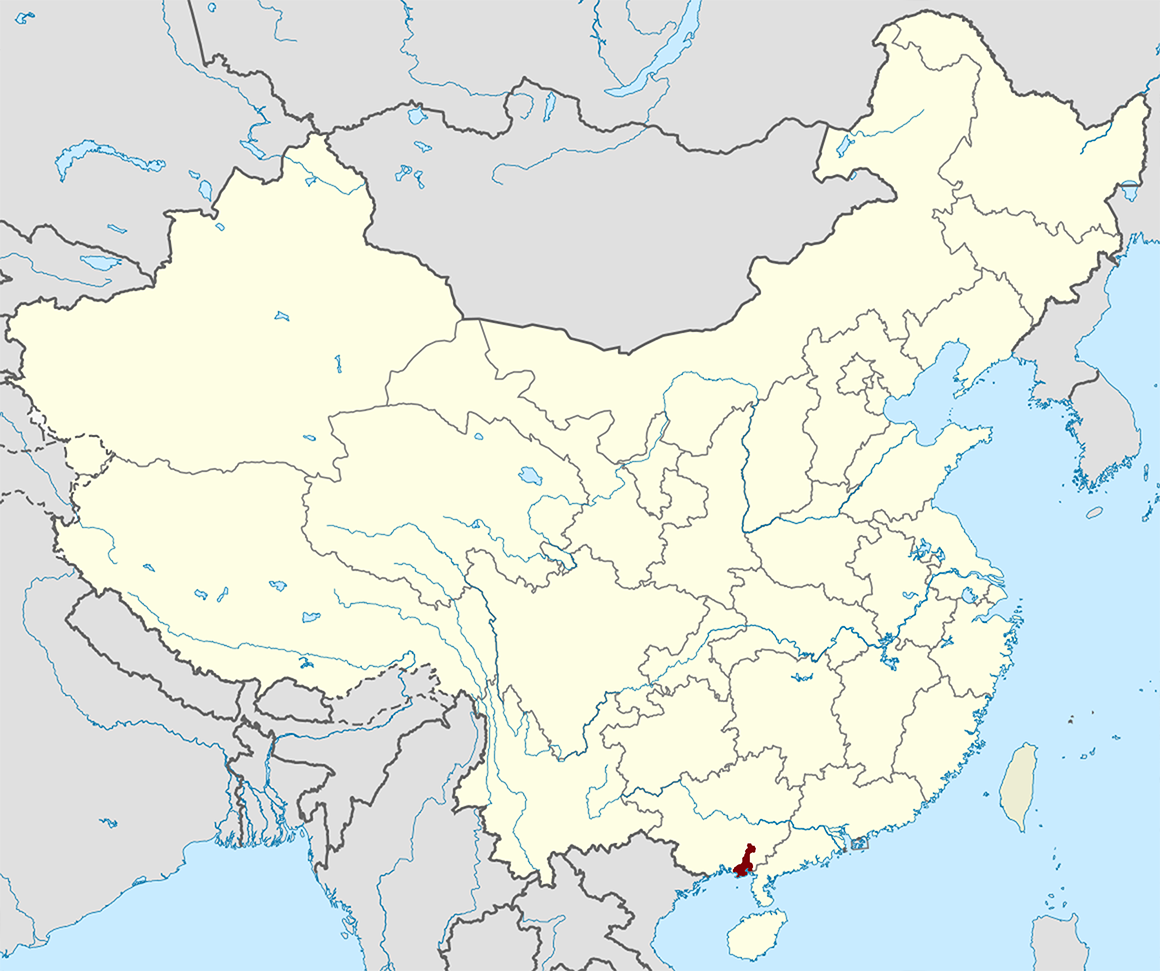
- Population
  - 740s or 750s: 3,029
  - 1070s or 1080s: Unknown, 7,500 households
- History
  - Created: 634 (Tang dynasty)
  - Abolished: 1381 (Ming dynasty)
  - Succeeded by: Lianzhou Prefecture
- Contained within
  - Circuit: Guangnan Circuit; Guangnan West Circuit

Lian Prefecture
- Chinese: 廉州
Transcriptions
Standard Mandarin
- Hanyu Pinyin: Lián Zhōu

Lianzhou or Lian Prefecture was a zhou (prefecture) in imperial China in modern Guangxi, China. It existed (intermittently) from 634 to 1381. Between 742 and 758 it was known as Hepu Commandery.

== Counties ==
Lian Prefecture administered the following counties (縣) through history: Hepu (合浦), Shikang (石康), Cailong (蔡龍), Dalian (大廉), and Fengshan (封山). Its administrative area corresponds to modern Beihai, Hepu County, and Pubei County.
