= Lu Yin (Eastern Wu) =

3rd century Eastern Wu general

- 陸胤

Commander of the Left Hulin (左虎林督)
- In office ?–?
- Monarch: Sun Xiu

Area Commander of Xiling (西陵督)
- In office 258 – ?
- Monarch: Sun Xiu

General Who Pacifies the South (安南將軍)
- In office ? – 258
- Monarch: Sun Quan / Sun Liang

Colonel Who Pacifies the South (安南校尉)
- In office 248 – ?
- Monarch: Sun Quan

Inspector of Jiao Province (交州刺史)
- In office 248 – ?
- Monarch: Sun Quan

Commandant Who Supervises the Army (督軍都尉)
- In office ? – 248
- Monarch: Sun Quan

Personal details
- Born: Unknown (Note: Lu Yin was younger than his brother Lu Kai, who was born in 198. Thus, his birth year should be between 198 and 240.) Suzhou, Jiangsu
- Died: Unknown
- Children: Lu Shi
- Relatives: Lu Kai (older brother); Lu Xun (relative); Lu Mao (relative)
- Occupation: Military general, politician
- Courtesy name: Jingzong (敬宗)
- Peerage: Marquis of a Chief Village (都亭侯)
- Father: Unknown (same generation cousin of Lu Xun)

Lu Yin (fl. third century), courtesy name Jingzong, was a Chinese military general and politician of the state of Eastern Wu during the Three Kingdoms period of China. He was the younger brother of Lu Kai and a relative of Lu Xun, who respectively served as the eighth and third Imperial Chancellors of Eastern Wu.

== Family background ==
Lu Yin was from Wu County, Wu Commandery (吳郡), which is present-day Suzhou, Jiangsu. The Lu clan, which he was from, was one of the four most influential clans in Wu Commandery and also in the Jiangdong (or Wu) region at the time. (Note: The four great clans of Wu Commandery were the Gu (顧), Lu (陸), Zhu (朱) and Zhang (張) clans. The four great clans of the Jiangdong region were the Gu (顧), Lu (陸), Yu (虞) and Wei (魏) clans. Some notable members from each clan were: Gu Yong, Gu Shao and Gu Tan of the Gu clan; Lu Xun, Lu Ji and Lu Kai of the Lu clan; Zhu Huan and Zhu Ju of the Zhu clan; Zhang Wen of the Zhang clan; Yu Fan of the Yu clan; and Wei Teng (魏騰) of the Wei clan.) This Lu clan were descendants of Tian Tong (田通), a son of King Xuan of Qi, King Xuan enfeoffed Tian Tong at Lu (陸; in modern Laoling, Shandong), Tian Tong adopted Lu as his surname. He was the younger brother of Lu Kai and a son of a same generation cousin of Lu Xun, who served as the eighth and third Imperial Chancellors of Eastern Wu respectively.

== Role in the Sun He–Sun Ba succession struggle ==
Lu Yin started his career as an Imperial Clerk (御史) and Gentleman in the Selection Bureau of the Imperial Secretariat (尚書選曹郎) during the reign of Sun Quan, the founding emperor of Eastern Wu. Sun He, Sun Quan's third son and heir apparent, heard of Lu Yin's talent and treated him exceptionally well.

Around the 240s, there was a power struggle between Sun He, the Crown Prince, and his fourth brother Sun Ba, the Prince of Lu, over the succession to their father's throne. While Sun He became worried that his father would depose and replace him, Sun Ba became increasingly set on seizing the position of Crown Prince from Sun He. Each of the two princes had a faction supporting him. During this time, Sun Quan considered replacing Sun He with Sun Ba so he privately asked Yang Zhu (楊笁), one of Sun Ba's supporters, about his thoughts on Sun Ba. Yang Zhu sang praises of Sun Ba and nearly convinced Sun Quan to replace Sun He with Sun Ba. A servant who eavesdropped on the private conversation between Sun Quan and Yang Zhu secretly reported what he heard to Sun He.

At the time, Lu Yin had been assigned to a position in Wuchang (武昌; present-day Ezhou, Hubei) and was about to leave the imperial capital, Jianye (present-day Nanjing, Jiangsu). When he went to bid Sun He farewell, Sun He publicly declined to meet him. However, Sun He later disguised himself and sneaked into Lu Yin's carriage to discuss with him how to safeguard his position as Crown Prince. They decided to seek help from Lu Yin's relative Lu Xun, a senior general who later became the third Imperial Chancellor of Wu. Lu Xun then wrote a memorial to Sun Quan to dissuade him from replacing Sun He with Sun Ba. Sun Quan was surprised to receive Lu Xun's memorial and he thought that Yang Zhu revealed the details of their private conversation. When Yang Zhu insisted that he did not, Sun Quan ordered him to find out how Lu Xun knew about it. Yang Zhu then deduced that it must have been Lu Yin who told Lu Xun in Wuchang. Sun Quan then sent a messenger to check with Lu Xun, who confirmed that it was Lu Yin who told him.

Sun Quan then ordered Lu Yin to be arrested and interrogated. While being tortured during interrogation, Lu Yin refused to reveal that it was actually the servant who told them, so as to protect Sun He and prevent him from being implicated. Instead, he lied that it was Yang Zhu who told them about it. Sun Quan then ordered Yang Zhu to be arrested and interrogated as well. Yang Zhu, unable to withstand the torture, falsely admitted that he told Lu Yin. As Sun Quan had already suspected that it was Yang Zhu who leaked the secret, he became even more convinced after hearing Yang Zhu's false confession, so he executed Yang Zhu and released Lu Yin. (Note: In his Zizhi Tongjian Kaoyi, Sima Guang was skeptical of the account found in Wu Lu; he opinioned that Yang Zhu died after Sun He was deposed as crown prince. Sima probably based his opinion on Sun Ba's biography in Sanguozhi, which recorded that Yang Zhu's corpse was dumped into a river after Sun He was deposed and Sun Ba was forced to commit suicide.)

== Pacifying rebellions in Jiao Province ==
Lu Yin was later commissioned as a Commandant Who Supervises the Army (督軍都尉) in Hengyang Commandery (衡陽郡; around present-day Xiangtan, Hunan).

In 248, rebel forces in the southern commanderies of Jiaozhi (around present-day Hanoi, Vietnam) and Jiuzhen (九真; around present-day Thanh Hóa, Vietnam) attacked and seized control of cities from their administrators appointed by the Wu government. This triggered a wave of unrest throughout Jiao Province, which Jiaozhi and Jiuzhen commanderies were part of. In response, Sun Quan appointed Lu Yin as the Inspector (刺史) of Jiao Province and promoted him to Colonel Who Pacifies the South (安南校尉) to deal with the unrest.

After assuming office in Jiao Province, Lu Yin managed to placate the locals through acts of kindness and goodwill, and succeeded in gaining their trust and respect. Huang Wu (黃吳), a local chieftain from Gaoliang Commandery (高涼郡; around present-day Yangjiang, Guangdong), led over 3,000 households to surrender to Lu Yin. Lu Yin then led Wu forces southward to pacify the revolts. In order to convince the local tribes of his sincerity towards making peace with them, he distributed large sums of money to the locals. Won over by Lu Yin's generosity, more than 100 local chieftains led over 50,000 households out of the hills to surrender to him and pledge allegiance to Wu. With the surrender of these local tribes, Lu Yin succeeded in restoring peace and stability in Jiao Province.

The Wu government promoted Lu Yin to General Who Pacifies the South (安南將軍) as a reward for his achievements. Lu Yin later led Wu forces to attack rebels in Cangwu Commandery (蒼梧郡; around present-day Wuzhou, Guangxi) and defeated them. Throughout the campaign against the rebels, Lu Yin recruited over 8,000 troops to serve in his army.

In Vietnamese history, Lady Triệu was the one who led the people of Jiuzhen (Cửu Chân) Commandery to rebel against Wu rule. She managed to resist the Wu forces for about five or six months before she lost and decided to take her own life.

== Later life ==
In 258, during the reign of Sun Xiu, Lu Kang was appointed as the Area Commander of Xiling (西陵; around present-day Yichang, Hubei) near the western frontier of Wu. He was also awarded the peerage of a Marquis of a Chief Village (都亭侯). However, he was soon reassigned from the border to serve as a commander of the Left Hulin (左虎林) corps of the Wu army.

Around this time, Hua He, an assistant official in the Palace Secretariat, wrote a memorial to the emperor to praise Lu Yin for his achievements during his decade-long tenure as the governor of Jiao Province and recommend him as a talent to serve in higher positions in the Wu central government.

== Family ==
Lu Yin died in an unknown year. His son, Lu Shi (陸式), inherited his peerage as a Marquis of a Chief Village. Like his father, Lu Shi served as a military officer in Wu and held the positions of Area Commander of Chaisang (柴桑; around present-day Jiujiang, Jiangxi) and General Who Spreads Martial Might (揚武將軍). In 275, the last Wu emperor Sun Hao forced Lu Shi and his relative Lu Yi (陸禕) to relocate from Jianye (present-day Nanjing, Jiangsu) to the remote Jian'an Commandery (建安郡; covering parts of present-day Fujian) in the south. Three years later, Sun Hao recalled Lu Shi back to Jianye and restored him to his previous position and peerage.

== See also ==
- Lists of people of the Three Kingdoms
