= Yulin Prefecture =

Historical administrative division in Guangxi, China

Yulin Prefecture (鬱林州) Yulin Commandery (鬱林郡)
- Population
  - 740s or 750s: 9,699
  - 1070s or 1080s: Unknown, 3,564 households
- History
  - Preceded by: Yu Prefecture (鬱州)
  - Created: 666 (Tang dynasty)
  - Abolished: 1912 (R.O. China)
  - Succeeded by: Yulin County
- Contained within
  - Circuit: Tang dynasty: Lingnan Circuit; Song dynasty: Guangnan Circuit; Guangnan West Circuit

Yulin Prefecture
- Traditional Chinese: 鬱林州
- Simplified Chinese: 郁林州
Transcriptions
Standard Mandarin
- Hanyu Pinyin: Yùlín Zhōu

Yulin Commandery
- Traditional Chinese: 鬱林郡
- Simplified Chinese: 郁林郡
Transcriptions
Standard Mandarin
- Hanyu Pinyin: Yùlín Jùn

Yulinzhou or Yulin Prefecture was a zhou (prefecture) in imperial China in modern southern Guangxi, China. It existed from 666 to 1912, and between 742 and 758 it was known as Yulin Commandery.
