= Dai Liang =

Dai Liang is the name of:

- Dai Liang (Han dynasty), Eastern Han dynasty recluse and poet
- Dai Liang (Ming dynasty), late Yuan and early Ming writer
- Birth name of A Bu
