= Guǎng Prefecture =

Prefecture of Imperial China

Guǎng Prefecture (廣州): Pan Prefecture (番州); Nanhai Commandery (南海郡); Xingwang Prefecture (興王府)
- Population
  - 740s or 750s: 221,500
  - 1070s or 1080s: Unknown, 143,261 households
- Contained within
  - Circuit: Tang dynasty: Lingnan Circuit; Song dynasty: Guangnan Circuit; Guangnan West Circuit

Guǎng Prefecture
- Traditional Chinese: 廣州
- Simplified Chinese: 广州
Transcriptions
Standard Mandarin
- Hanyu Pinyin: Guǎng Zhōu

Guǎngzhōu or Guǎng Prefecture was a zhou (prefecture) in imperial China in the Pearl River Delta. Its administrative area contained parts of modern Guangdong, as well as both modern Hong Kong and Macau. Between 601 and 607 it was known as Pan Prefecture, between 742 and 758 as Nanhai Commandery, and in the 10th century (before 971) as Xingwang Prefecture (as the capital of Southern Han).

The modern sub-provincial city Guangzhou, established in 1918, retains its name.

== Counties ==
1. Nanhai (南海)
2. Panyu (番禺)
3. Zengcheng (增城)
4. Qingyuan (清遠)
5. Huaiji (懷集)
6. Dongguan (東筦)
7. Xinhui (新會)
8. Yining (義寧) or Xin'an (信安)
9. Sihui (四會)
10. Xiangshan (香山)
11. Huameng (化蒙)
12. Jianshui (洊水)
13. Chengyang (湞陽)
14. Hankuang (浛洭)
