= Chu Đạt =

Rebellion leader during the Vietnamese's Second Era of Northern Domination

Chu Đạt, also rendered as Zhu Da (Chinese: 朱達; ?–160), was the leader of a rebellion against China's Eastern Han dynasty in Jiuzhen (Cửu Chân), located in modern-day Vietnam. The rebellion began in 157 when Chu Đạt killed Cư Phong, a magistrate who was hated by the citizenry for his cruelty and greed. After killing the magistrate, Chu Đạt gathered 4,000 - 5,000 men, and marched north at the head of this rebel army. War broke out between Ni Shi (Vietnamese: Nghê Thức), the prefect of Jiuzhen, and the rebels, during which Ni Shi was killed in action. For that incident, Emperor Huan awarded Ni Shi's family 60 silver bars and appointed his two sons as officials in Lang Trung. The emperor then appointed Wei Lang, the military head of the district to quell the rebellion. The rebels were eventually defeated by Wei Lang. Chu Đạt, and 2,000 of his followers, were beheaded.

The story of Chu Đạt's rebellion is found only in Chinese records, not Vietnamese records, which has led historians to suggest that he may have been of Chinese origin.
