= Shi Hui =

Shi Hui may refer to:

- Shi Hui (Spring and Autumn Period) (6th century BC), Jin general
- Shi Hui (Three Kingdoms) (165–227), third son of the Han dynasty warlord Shi Xie
- Shi Hui (Duke of Fan), Zhou dynasty general
- Shi Hui (actor) (1915–1957), Chinese actor and film director
- Shi Hui (施惠), one of the possible authors of the 14th-century Chinese novel Water Margin
