= Rinan =

Southernmost commandery of Chinese Han dynasty

Commanderies of the Eastern Han dynasty in 219 AD

Rinan (Chinese: 日南; pinyin: Rìnán; Vietnamese: Nhật Nam), also rendered as Jih-nan, was the southernmost commandery of the Chinese Han dynasty. It was located in the central area of modern-day Vietnam between Quảng Bình and Bình Định provinces. It was administered by a local mandarin under direction from the capital of Jiaozhi at Leilou or Longbian (after c. AD 200) near modern Hanoi. It was part of the territories briefly occupied by Trưng Trắc's rebellion forces in AD 39.

The concept of "Rinan" (lit "South of the Sun", referring to the Southern Hemisphere) was originally astronomical: above the Tropic of Cancer, the Chinese always faced south during religious ceremonies concerning the sun. In his Records of the Grand Historian, Sima Qian claimed the Qin dynasty had expanded so far as Rinan, where the houses faced north instead of south. The Han claimed this conceptual region as early as 111 BC upon their conquest of Nanyue but did not administer an actual district under the name until 48 BC.

Under the Western Han, it was recorded as having 14,000 households or about 69,000 people. Several embassies from Rome (Da Qin) during the 1st and 2nd centuries – including one from Marcus Aurelius in AD 166 – are recorded as having come via Rinan, presumably by sea via India.

In AD 264, during the division of Jiaozhou by the Emperor Jing of Wu, Rinan was placed under the new Jiaozhou.

== Counties ==
- Zhuwu
- Bijing
- Xijuan
- Lurong (Lô Dung)
- Xianglin (Tượng Lâm)

== See also ==
- Cửu Chân
- First Chinese domination of Vietnam
- Lam Ap Kingdom
- History of the administrative divisions of China
- Southern Hemisphere
