= Zhao Tuo =

Emperor of Nanyue from 203 BC to 137 BC

Emperor Wu of Nanyue Triệu Vũ Đế 南越武帝
- Emperor of Nanyue
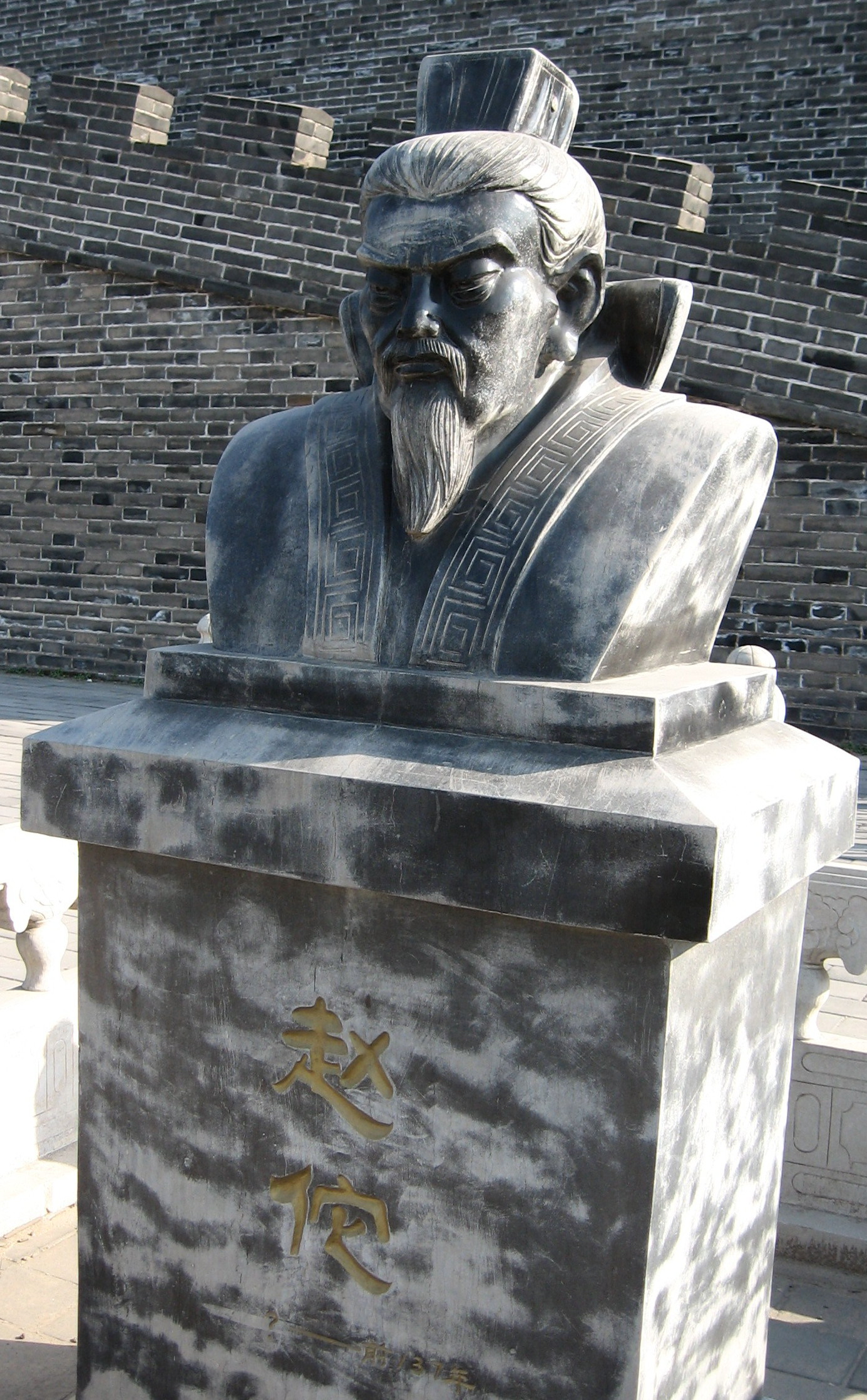
- Statue of Zhao Tuo in his birthplace, Zhengding, Hebei

Emperor of Nanyue
- Reign: 203–137 BC
- Successor: Zhao Mo (Triệu Văn Đế)
- Born: 240 BC; Zhengding County, Shijiazhuang
- Died: 137 BC (aged 103); Nanyue
- Burial: Guangzhou
Posthumous name
- Emperor Wu 武帝; Chinese: 開天體道聖武神哲皇帝; Vietnamese: Khai Thiên Thể Đạo Thánh Vũ Thần Triết Hoàng Đế
- House: Zhao (Triệu)
- Dynasty: Nanyue

Zhao Tuo/Triệu Đà

Chinese name
- Traditional Chinese: 趙佗
- Simplified Chinese: 赵佗
Transcriptions
Standard Mandarin
- Hanyu Pinyin: Zhào Tuó
- Wade–Giles: Chao T'o
Yue: Cantonese
- Yale Romanization: Jiuh Tòh
- Jyutping: Ziu^{6} To^{4}
- IPA: [tsiw˨.tʰɔ˩]

Vietnamese name
- Vietnamese alphabet: Triệu Đà
- Chữ Hán: 趙佗

Emperor Wu/Vũ Đế

Chinese name
- Chinese: 武帝
- Literal meaning: The Martial Emperor
Transcriptions
Standard Mandarin
- Hanyu Pinyin: Wǔdì
Yue: Cantonese
- Yale Romanization: Móuh Dai
- Jyutping: Mou^{5} Dai^{3}

Vietnamese name
- Vietnamese alphabet: Vũ Đế
- Chữ Hán: 武帝

Zhao Tuo (240–137 BC, Chinese: 趙佗) also known as Emperor Wu and as Triệu Đà or Triệu Vũ Đế in Vietnamese, was a Chinese general of the Qin dynasty and the first king and emperor of Nanyue. He participated in the Qin conquest of the Baiyue peoples of Guangdong, Guangxi, and Northern Vietnam. After the fall of the Qin, he established the independent kingdom of Nanyue with its capital in Panyu (now Guangzhou) in 204 BC. Upon the establishment of the Han dynasty, Zhao initially accepted a position similar to its other kings, recognizing Liu Bang's nominal authority in exchange for good relations and autonomy. After relations became strained, he declared himself emperor of Nanyue in 185 BC, reigning until his death. Some traditional Vietnamese historians considered him the founder of the Triệu dynasty while some contemporary historians contest that he was a foreign invader, due to his Han Chinese origin.

== Life ==
=== Establishment of Nanyue ===
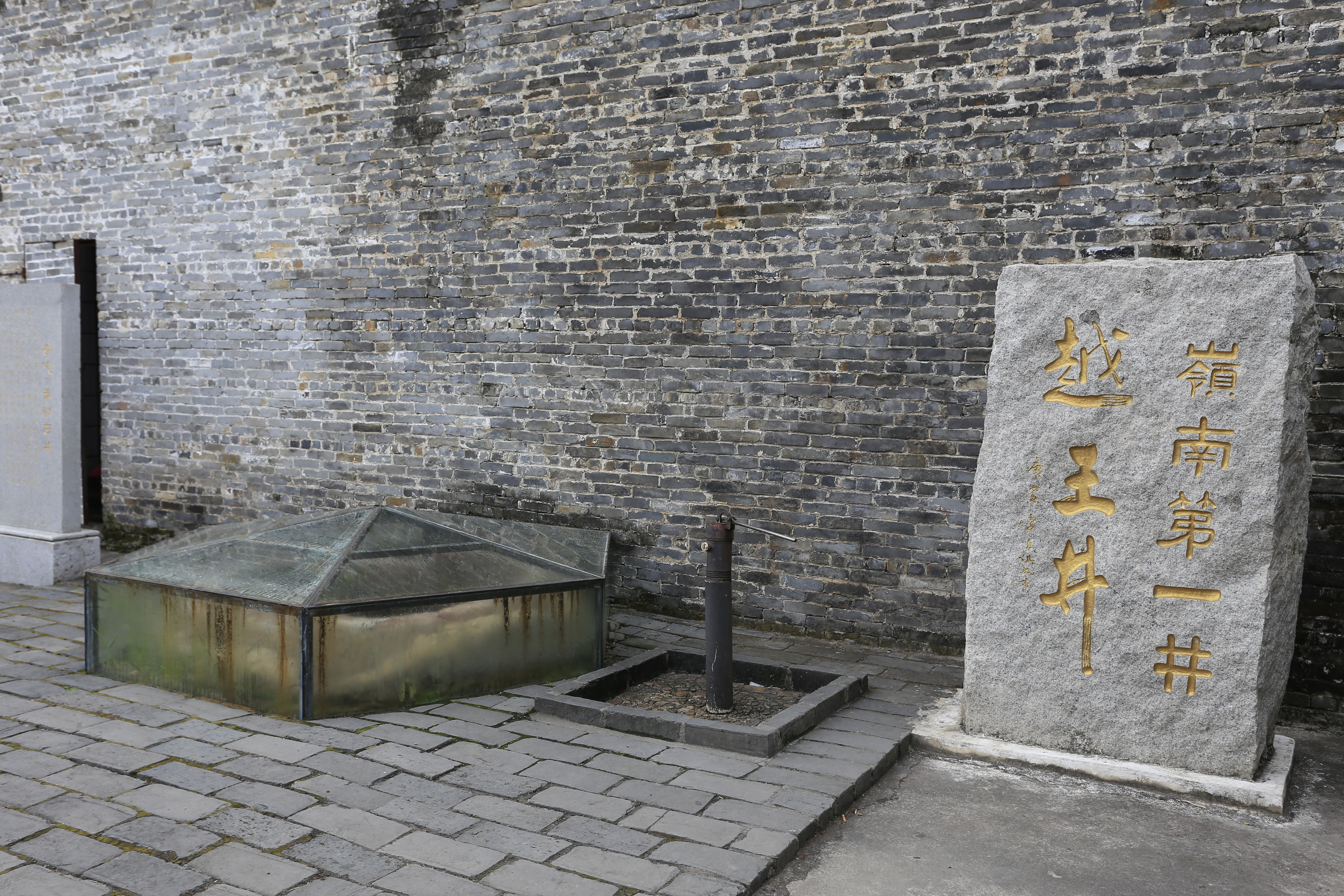
The "Well of King of Yue", which believed to be digged by Zhao Tuo when he served as the magistrate of Longchuan County

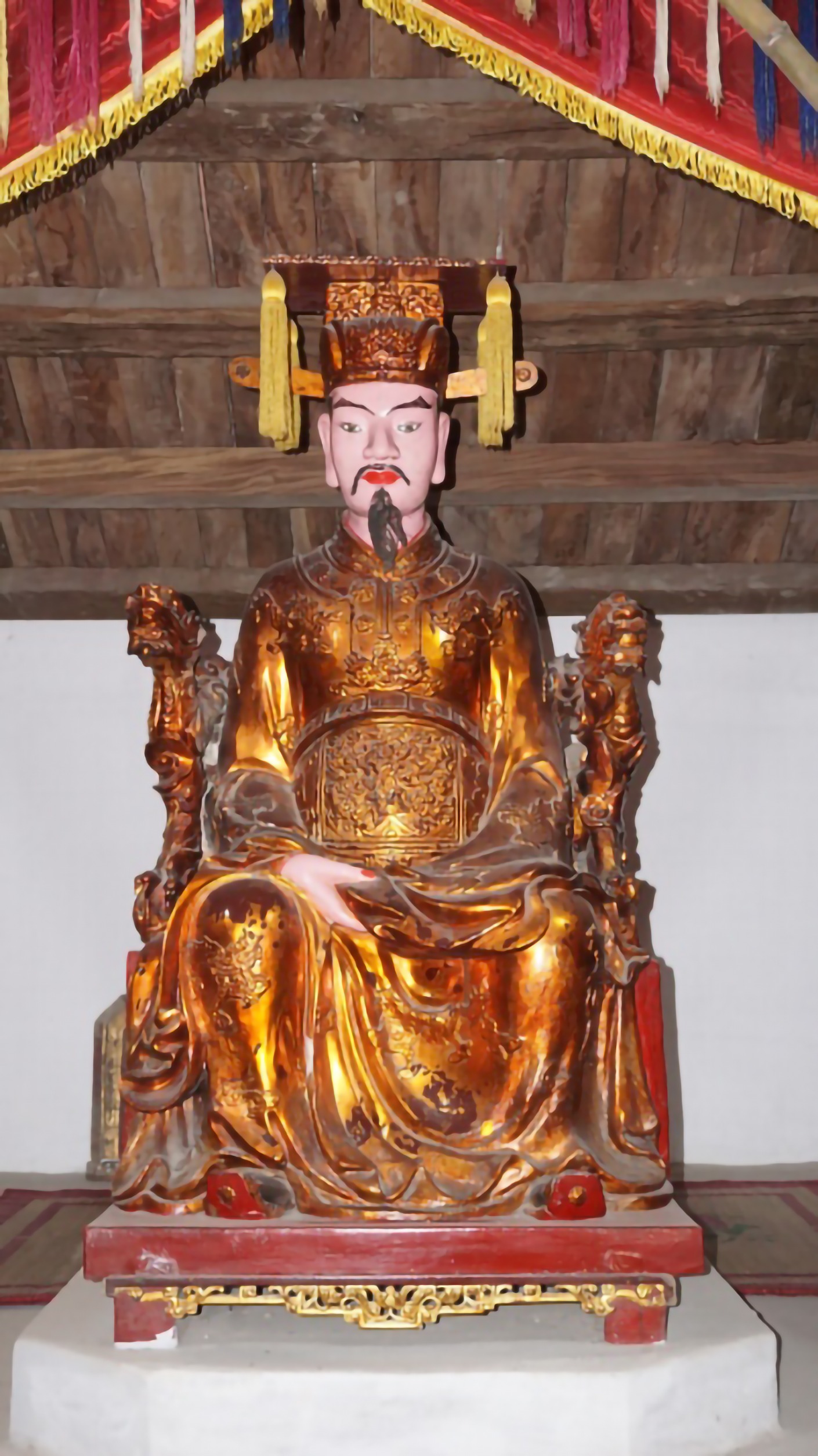
Triệu Đà statue at đình Xuân Quan, Hưng Yên, Vietnam

Zhao Tuo was born around 240 BC in Zhengding, Hebei, in northern China. The area had long been home to the Beidi states of Xianyu and Zhongshan but, by the time of Zhao's birth, had been annexed by the Huaxia state of Zhao. When Zhao was defeated and annexed by Qin in 222 BC, Zhao Tuo joined Qin, serving as one of their generals in their conquest of the Baiyue. The territory of those conquered Yues was divided into the three provinces of Guilin, Nanhai, and Xiang. Zhao served as magistrate in the province of Nanhai until his military commander, Ren Xiao, fell ill. Before he died, Ren advised Zhao not to get involved in the affairs of the declining Qin, and instead set up his own independent kingdom centered around the geographically remote and isolated city of Panyu (modern Guangzhou). Ren gave Zhao full authority to act as military commander of Nanhai and died shortly afterwards. Zhao immediately closed off the roads at Hengpu, Yangshan, and Huangqi. Using one excuse or another he eliminated the Qin officials and replaced them with his own appointees. By the time the Qin fell in 206 BC, Zhao had also conquered the provinces of Guilin and Xiang. He declared himself king of Nanyue, the Southern Yue.

=== Conflict with the Han ===
In June or July 196 BC, Emperor Gaozu of Han dispatched Lu Jia to recognize Zhao Tuo as king of Nanyue. Lu gave Zhao a seal legitimizing him as king of Nanyue in return for his nominal submission to the Han.

In 185 BC, Empress Lü's officials outlawed trade of iron and horses with Nanyue. Zhao Tuo retaliated by proclaiming himself emperor of Nanyue and attacking the neighboring kingdom of Changsha, taking a few border towns. In 181 BC, Zhou Zao was dispatched by Empress Lü to attack Nanyue, but the heat and dampness caused many of his officers and men to fall ill, and he failed to make it across the mountains into enemy territory. Zhao began to menace the neighboring kingdoms of Minyue, Western Ou, and Luo. After securing their submission he began passing out edicts in a similar manner to the Han emperor.

In late 180 BC, Emperor Wen of Han made efforts to appease Zhao. Learning that Zhao's parents were buried in Zhending, he set aside a town close by just to take care of their graves. Zhao's cousins were appointed to high offices at the Han court. He also withdrew the army stationed in Changsha on the Han-Nanyue border. In response, Zhao rescinded his claims as emperor while communicating with the Han. However, he continued using the title of emperor within his kingdom. Tribute bearing envoys from Nanyue were sent to the Han and thus the iron trade was resumed.

=== Conquest of Âu Lạc ===
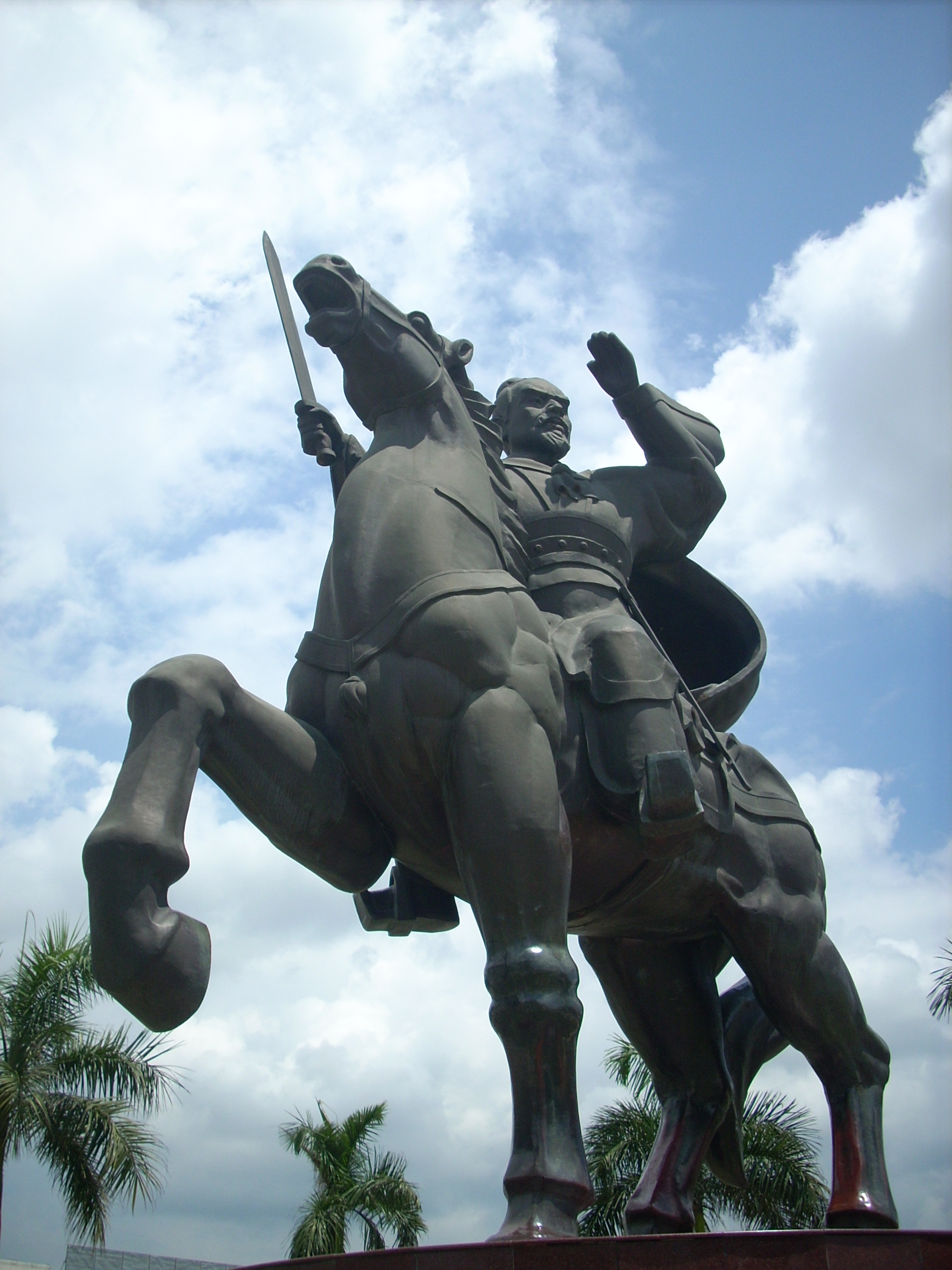
A statue of Zhao in front of Heyuan Railway Station

Having mobilized his armies for war with the Han dynasty, Zhao Tuo found the conquest of Âu Lạc both "tempting and feasible".

Zhao Tuo's early setbacks and eventual victory against King An Dương were mentioned in Records of the Outer Territories of the Jiao province (交州外域記) and Records [about the Era] of Jin Taikang (晉太康記). The Records of the Grand Historian mention neither King An Dương nor Zhao Tuo's military conquest of Âu Lạc; just that after Empress Lü's death (180 BC), Zhao Tuo used his own troops to menace and used wealth to bribe the Minyue, the Western Ou, and the Luo (Âu Lạc) into submission. The campaign against the Âu Lạc inspired a legend whose theme is the transfer of the turtle claw-triggered crossbow from King An Dương to Zhao Tuo. According to this legend, ownership of the crossbow conferred political power. As described in one account, Cao Lỗ the military engineer is quoted as saying: “He who is able to hold this crossbow rules the realm; he who is not able to hold this crossbow will perish.”

Unsuccessful on the battlefield against the supernatural crossbow, Zhao Tuo asked for a truce and sent his son Zhong Shi, to submit to King An Dương to serve him. There, he and King An Dương's daughter, Mỵ Châu, fell in love and were married. A vestige of the matrilocal organization demanded that the husband came to live in the residence of his wife's family. As a result, they resided at An Dương's court until Zhong Shi managed to lay his hands upon the magic crossbow that was the source of King An Dương's power. Meanwhile, King An Dương treated Cao Lỗ disrespectfully, and he abandoned him.

Zhong Shi had Mỵ Châu show him her father's sacred crossbow, at with point he secretly changed its trigger, thus neutralizing its special powers. He stole the turtle claw, rendering the crossbow useless, then returned to his father, who thereupon launched new attack on Âu Lạc and this time defeated King An Dương. History records that, in his defeat, the King jumped into the ocean to commit suicide. In some versions, he was told by the turtle about his daughter's betrayal and killed his own daughter before killing himself. A legend, however, discloses that a golden turtle emerged from the water and guided him into the watery realm.

Zhao Tuo subsequently incorporated the regions into his Nanyue domain, but left the indigenous chiefs in control of the population with the royal court in Cổ Loa. For the first time, the region formed part of a polity headed by a Chinese ruler. He posted two legates to supervise the Âu Lạc lords, one in the Red River Delta, which was named Jiaozhi, and one in the Mã and Cả River, which was named Jiuzhen. Some records suggest that he also invested a king at Cổ Loa who continued to preside over the Âu Lạc lords. The legates established commercial outposts accessible by sea.

=== Death ===
Zhao Tuo died in 137 BC at the age of 103 and was succeeded by his grandson, Zhao Mo.

== See also ==
- History of China
- History of Vietnam
- Qin's campaign against the Yue tribes
- Nanyue
- Triệu dynasty
- Phiên Ngung
- Trọng Thuỷ
- Han-Nanyue War
- An Dương Vương
- Âu Lạc
- Phiên Ngung Palace
- Museum of the Mausoleum of King Triệu Mạt
- Luobowan Tomb No.1
- Đông Sơn culture
- Changsha (state)
- Minyue
- Yelang
- Bách Việt

Zhao Tuo/Triệu Vũ Đế Triệu dynasty Born: 240 BC Died: 137 BC
Preceded by Dynasty established	Emperor of Nanyue; 203–137 BC	Succeeded by Zhao Mo
