= Hepu Commandery =

Chinese military commandery

Hepu Commandery (Chinese: 合浦郡, also rendered as Hợp Phố in Vietnamese) was a Chinese commandery that existed from Han dynasty to Tang dynasty. Hepu territory was located in the regions of modern coastal Guangxi, southwestern Guangdong, and Hainan.

== History ==
Hepu Commandery was established in 112 BC, when the Han dynasty annexed the Nanyue kingdom. In late Western Han period, it had a population of 15,398 households (78,980 individuals) in its 5 counties, namely Xuwen (徐聞), Gaoliang (高涼), Hepu (合浦), Linyun (臨允), Zhulu (朱盧). During the Eastern Han period, Zhulu was abolished while the former Zhuya Commandery in Hainan was merged into Hepu as the Zhuya County. The population in 140 AD was 23,121 households (86,617 individuals).

During the Three Kingdoms, Hepu was part of Eastern Wu. The commandery was renamed to Zhuguan (珠官) in 228; during the reign of Sun Liang, the name was changed back. When Jin dynasty unified China in 280, Cangwu consisted of 6 counties and recorded a population of 2,000 households. The commandery was abolished when the Sui dynasty conquered the Chen dynasty.

In Tang dynasty, Hepu Commandery was an alternative name of Yue Prefecture (越州), later renamed Lian Prefecture in 634. The commandery consisted of 4 counties, and had a population of 3,312 households (13,029 individuals).
