= Cangwu Commandery =

Chinese commandery

Cangwu Commandery (Chinese: 蒼梧郡, Vietnamese: Thương Ngô) was a Chinese commandery that existed from Han dynasty to Tang dynasty. Cangwu's territory was located in the modern provinces of Guangxi and Guangdong, with its capital at Guangxin (廣信), present-day Wuzhou.

== History ==
Cangwu Commandery was established in 112 BC, when the Han dynasty annexed the Nanyue kingdom. In late Western Han period, it had a population of 24,739 households (146,160 individuals) in its 10 counties, namely Guangxin, Xiemu (謝沐), Gaoyao (高要), Fengyang (封陽), Linhe (臨賀), Duanxi (端谿), Fengcheng (馮乘), Fuchuan (富川), Lipu (荔蒲), Mengling (猛陵). During the Eastern Han period, a new county, Zhangping (鄣平), was added. The population in 140 AD was 111,395 households (466,975 individuals).

During the Three Kingdoms, Cangwu was part of Eastern Wu, and a number of counties were created in this period. In 226, a new commandery, Linhe, was split off from Cangwu. When Jin dynasty unified China in 280, Cangwu consisted of 12 counties and recorded a population of 7,700 households.

During the reign of Emperor Mu of Jin, three more commanderies – Jinkang (晉康), Xinning (新寧) and Yongping (永平) – were created on the lands of Cangwu. In 464, the population was 4,547 households (17,710 individuals). The commandery was abolished when the Sui dynasty conquered the Chen dynasty.

In Sui and Tang dynasties, Cangwu Commandery was an alternative name of Feng Prefecture, later renamed Wu Prefecture in 621. The commandery consisted of 3 counties, and had a population of 1,290 households in 741.
