= Yulin Commandery =

Chinese commandery

Yulin Commandery (鬱林郡, Vietnamese: Uất Lâm) was a Chinese commandery that existed from Qin dynasty to Tang dynasty in the modern region of Guangxi.

== History ==
Yulin Commandery was established as Guilin Commandery (桂林郡) in 214 BC, when the Qin dynasty conquered Lingnan. After the collapse of Qin, the commandery became part of the Nanyue kingdom.

In 112 BC, Nanyue was annexed by the Han dynasty, and the commandery was renamed to "Yulin". Yulin was one of the least populated commanderies: in the late Western Han period, it had a population of 12,415 households (71,162 individuals) in its 12 counties.

The commandery was part of Eastern Wu during the Three Kingdoms period. In 274 AD, a new Guilin Commandery was established on the northern half of Yulin. Jin dynasty unified China in 280. At the time, the commandery administered 9 counties, and recorded a population of 6,000 households. By the year 464, the number of counties had been increased to 17, and the total population, according to the Book of Song, was 1,121 households (5,727 individuals). The commandery was abolished when the Sui dynasty conquered the Chen dynasty.

In the Tang dynasty, the Yulin Prefecture was also known as Yulin Commandery. The commandery consisted of 4 counties, and had a population of 1,918 households (9,699 individuals).
