= Jiuzhen =

Chinese commandery in northern Vietnam

Jiuzhen (Vietnamese: Cửu Chân, Chinese: 九真) was a Chinese commandery within Jiaozhou. It is located in present-day Thanh Hóa Province, Vietnam.

Michel Ferlus (2012) and Frédéric Pain (2020) propose that 九真 Old Chinese *kuˀ-cin transcribed *k.cin, a local autonym which is reflected in Puoc ksiːŋ muːl & Thavung ktiːŋ² meaning "human being, people". Both ksiːŋ and ktiːŋ² are from Proto-Vietic *kciːŋ, which consists of prefix *k- and root *ciɲ (“leg, foot”); thus, "human beings" are "(those who are) on foot", "those who stand on their feet."

Pain further suggests that "Cửu Chân might therefore have been inhabited by some ancestors of the Southern Vietic Thavung - Aheu."

== History ==
In 111 BC, Jiuzhen was formed after the Han conquest of Nanyue.

In 157, Chu Đạt rebelled in Jiuzhen and was defeated.

In 377, Li Xun seized Jiuzhen.
