= 791 =

Calendar year

791 in various calendars
- Gregorian calendar: 791; DCCXCI
- Ab urbe condita: 1544
- Armenian calendar: 240; ԹՎ ՄԽ
- Assyrian calendar: 5541
- Balinese saka calendar: 712–713
- Bengali calendar: 197–198
- Berber calendar: 1741
- Buddhist calendar: 1335
- Burmese calendar: 153
- Byzantine calendar: 6299–6300
- Chinese calendar: 庚午年 (Metal Horse); 3488 or 3281 — to — 辛未年 (Metal Goat); 3489 or 3282
- Coptic calendar: 507–508
- Discordian calendar: 1957
- Ethiopian calendar: 783–784
- Hebrew calendar: 4551–4552
- Hindu calendars
- Vikram Samvat: 847–848
- Shaka Samvat: 712–713
- Kali Yuga: 3891–3892
- Holocene calendar: 10791
- Iranian calendar: 169–170
- Islamic calendar: 174–175
- Japanese calendar: Enryaku 10 (延暦１０年)
- Javanese calendar: 686–687
- Julian calendar: 791; DCCXCI
- Korean calendar: 3124
- Minguo calendar: 1121 before ROC 民前1121年
- Nanakshahi calendar: −677
- Seleucid era: 1102/1103 AG
- Thai solar calendar: 1333–1334
- Tibetan calendar: ལྕགས་ཕོ་རྟ་ལོ་ (male Iron-Horse); 917 or 536 or −236 — to — ལྕགས་མོ་ལུག་ལོ་ (female Iron-Sheep); 918 or 537 or −235

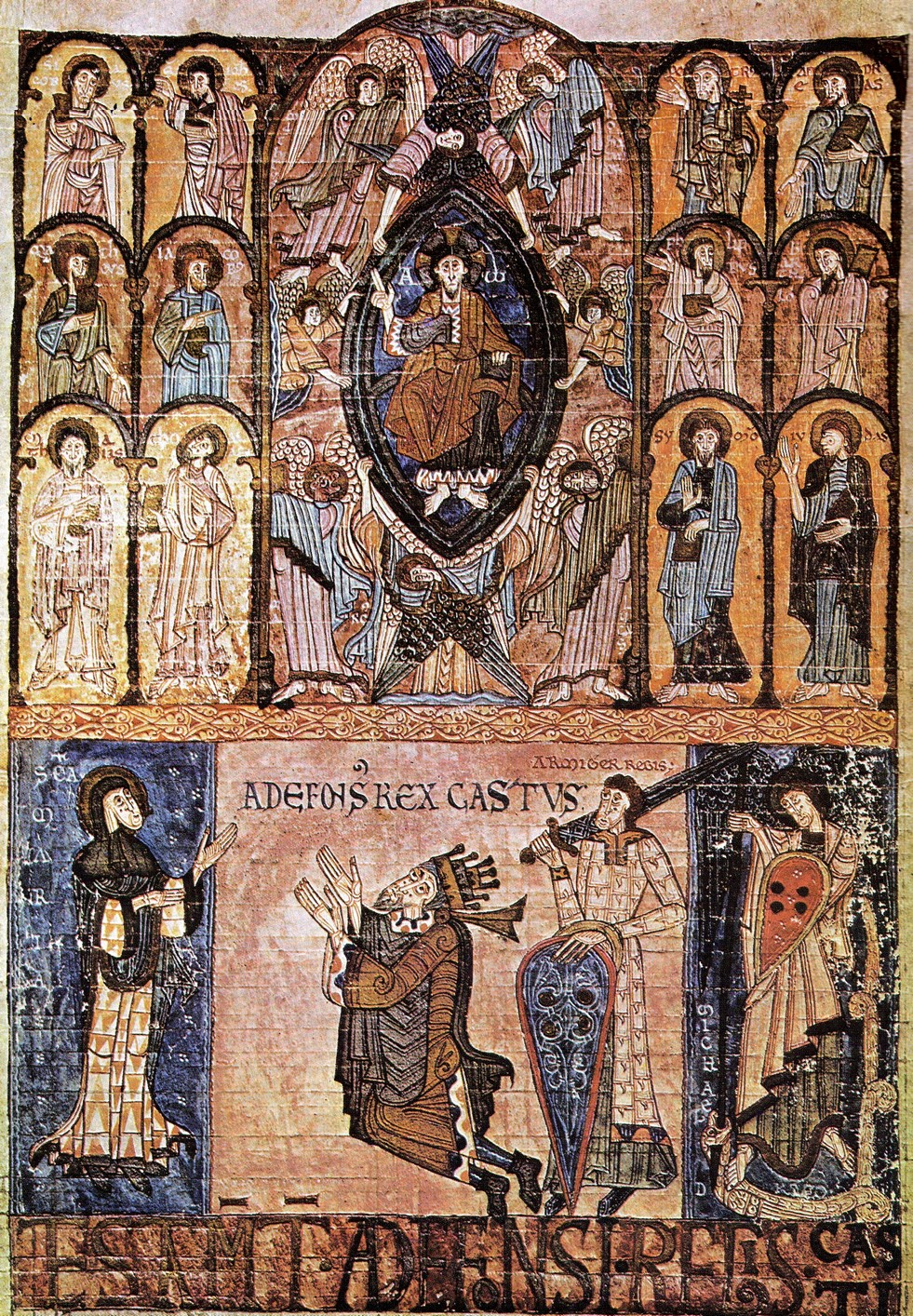
King Alfonso II of Asturias (12th century)

Year 791 (DCCXCI) was a common year starting on Saturday of the Julian calendar. The denomination 791 for this year has been used since the early medieval period, when the Anno Domini calendar era became the prevalent method in Europe for naming years.

== Events ==
=== By place ===
==== Europe ====
- The Avars, a pagan Asian nomadic horde that has settled down in what is today Hungary, invade Friuli and Bavaria. King Charlemagne assembles a Frankish army, and marches down the Danube River to ravage Avar territory. A Frankish-Lombard expeditionary force, under his son Pepin, (king of the Lombards) invades the Drava Valley and devastates Pannonia.
- Summer – Charlemagne loses most of his riding and baggage horses during an equine epidemic; many Saxons take advantage of Charlemagne's Avar setback and rebel once more.
- September 14 – Alfonso II, the son of former king Fruela I, becomes ruler of Asturias (Northern Spain). He moves the capital to Oviedo, the commercial centre of the region.

==== Britain ====
- Princes Ælf and Ælfwine of Northumbria, the sons of former king Ælfwald I, are persuaded to leave their sanctuary in York Minster, and are immediately forcibly drowned in Wonwaldremere, at the instigation of King Æthelred I.

==== Africa ====
- Emir Idris I, founder of the Idrisid dynasty and kingdom of Morocco, is poisoned on orders of Caliph Harun al-Rashid. He is succeeded by his son Idris II (only just two months old), who is raised by his mother Kenza among the Berbers of Volubilis.

==== Asia ====
- April – Tang forces retake the protectorate of Annan from rebelling Annamese chieftains Đỗ Anh Hàn, Phùng Hưng and Phùng An.

== Births ==
- Idris II, Muslim emir of Morocco (d. 828)
- Pei Xiu, chancellor of the Tang dynasty (d. 864)

== Deaths ==
- Artgal mac Cathail, king of Connacht (Ireland)
- Idris I, emir and founder of the Idrisid dynasty (b. 745)
- Wermad, bishop of Trier
- Zhang Xiaozhong, general of the Tang dynasty (b. 730)
