= Dương Đình Nghệ =

Military governor of Tĩnh Hải quân

Dương Đình Nghệ 楊廷藝
- Tĩnh Hải quân tiết độ sứ

Jiedushi of Tĩnh Hải quân
- Tenure: 931–937
- Predecessor: Khúc Thừa Mỹ
- Successor: Kiều Công Tiễn
- Born: November 22, 874; Làng Giàng, Ái Châu, Tĩnh Hải quân, Tang China (in present-day Bắc Ninh province, Vietnam)
- Died: March 937; Đại La citadel
- Issue: Dương Tam Kha Unnamed wife of Ngô Quyền Dương Vân Nga (?)
Names
- Dương Đình Nghệ (楊廷藝)

Dương Đình Nghệ (Chữ Hán: 楊廷藝; pinyin: Yáng Tíngyì; 874 – March 937; some sources record Dương Diên Nghệ, Chữ Hán: 楊延藝) was the jiedushi (military governor) of Tĩnh Hải quân from around 931 AD until his death in 937 AD. He was a prominent Vietnamese military commander and political figure whose leadership played an impactful role in Vietnam's early struggle for independence during the 10th century. Originally from Ái Châu (modern Thanh Hóa), he rose through the ranks as a loyal general of the Khúc clan, who had established native Vietnamese rule as military governors as the Tang dynasty collapsed.

In 931, he led a force of 3,000 hand-trained warriors from Thanh Hóa to Đại La (modern Hanoi), the heavily fortified city. There, he defeated the occupying Southern Han garrison who had taken control in 923, killing their commander Trình Bảo and driving out the remaining Chinese troops. With this victory, he secured the territory and proclaimed himself jiedushi (military governor) of Tĩnh Hải quân. This act not only restored autonomous rule but also demonstrated, for the first time in over a century, that Vietnamese forces could successfully resist a major Chinese military power.

As ruler, Dương Đình Nghệ governed with the aim of consolidating autonomy for Vietnamese and retaining peace. He is remembered as a disciplined, strategic leader who cultivated a talented circle of young commanders. Among them was Ngô Quyền, his most gifted protégé and future son-in-law, whom he trusted deeply. Through his policies, military reforms, and mentorship, Dương Đình Nghệ strengthened the foundations of local authority and prepared a new generation of Vietnamese leaders to defend the country's independence.

His rule was cut short in 937, when he was assassinated by one of his own subordinates, Kiều Công Tiễn, who sought to take power. This betrayal directly triggered the chain of events that led to Ngô Quyền's rise, outraged by his mentor's and father-in-law's murder, Ngô Quyền marched north with an army, fearing defeat Kiều Công Tiễn, invited Southern Han intervention but was defeated in battle and executed by Ngô Quyền before the Hans arrived. He then confronted the invading Southern Han, In 938, at the historic Battle of Bạch Đằng (938), Ngô Quyền achieved a victory ending nearly a millennium of Chinese rule and securing Vietnam's independence. Later Vietnamese dynastic founders including Đinh Bộ Lĩnh and Lê Hoàn were also connected to the influential Dương clan, reflecting the lasting political impact of the lineage he elevated. Today Dương Đình Nghệ is praised as one of the national heroes in the history of Vietnam.

== Name ==
Đại Việt Sử Ký Toàn Thư, Outer Records, Volume V, records his name as Dương Đình Nghệ, with a note: “Cương Mục records Dương Diên Nghệ, a native of Ái Châu, meaning Thanh Hóa (CMTB5, 17a). Chinese sources such as History of Song (vol. 488), Zizhi Tongjian etc, also write it as Dương Diên Nghệ. Five Dynasties History (vol. 65) writes it as in the Toàn Thư (Đình Nghệ). The confusion may come from similar-looking characters: 延 (diên) and 廷 (đình).”

Among the works that write his name as Dương Diên Nghệ is Khâm định Việt sử Thông giám cương mục. In its preliminary section, Volume V notes: “An Nam Kỷ Yếu writes it as Đình Nghệ. Now, following the Cương Mục (Chinese), it is changed back to Diên Nghệ.”

== Life ==
By the early 10th century, the Tang dynasty had entered a period of severe decline and was no longer able to maintain control over Tĩnh Hải quân (modern northern Vietnam). In 880, the Chinese military governor Zeng Gun withdrew his troops and effectively abandoned the area. From that point until 905, the Tang court continued to appoint short-term governors, but none of them exercised actual power within the region. Around 905, a prominent Vietnamese leader, Khúc Thừa Dụ, stepped forward and took control of the jiedushi office proclaiming himself as the military governor. As the Tang dynasty did not have strength to launch a campaign against him, they recognised his position officially. Khúc Thừa Dụ's rule marked a turning point, although Tĩnh Hải quân was still nominally part of the Tang realm, it was now governed by a native ruler acting independently without Chinese interference. This moment is widely viewed as the beginning of Vietnam's move toward self-rule from prolonged Chinese domination. His son Khúc Hạo, and grandson Khúc Thừa Mỹ went on to inherit the position of military governor.

Limited information exists on the origins and youth of Dương Đình Nghệ. He grew up during the decline of the Tang dynasty, when China fell into a chaotic period known as the Five Dynasties and Ten Kingdoms period. He was known as a loyal, talented swordsman and commander, diligently serving 3 generations of the Khuc clan. He was as an esteemed general under the Military Governor Khúc Hạo. To the north of Vietnam existed two major states in China, the Southern Han and the Later Liang. After Khúc Hạo died, in 919, his son, Khúc Thừa Mỹ sent envoys to the Later Liang court to present tribute and request investiture, the Later Liang granted it, this diplomatic act greatly angered the Southern Han court.

== March to the Northern Region ==
In the autumn, the seventh month of 923 (Chinese sources say 930), the Southern Han king Liu Yan wanting to reassert Chinese rule over the Vietnamese, sent his general Li Ke Zheng to attack Tĩnh Hải quân. After exchanges of combat, Li Ke Zheng managed to capture the Military Governor Khúc Thừa Mỹ and brought him back to China where he was imprisoned and presumed executed. The Han Court then appointed an official named Lý Tiến as the new administrator of Tĩnh Hải quân, and sent General Li Ke Zheng with a permanently large army to defend the heavily fortified military garrison in Dai La.

In 931, Dương Đình Nghệ, now in Ái Châu (Thanh Hóa), who has been long in planning, sought to finally avenge the Khúc clan his liege lords. According to Khâm Định Việt Sử Thông Giám Cương Mục, Dương Đình Nghệ aspired and had plans to eventually restore Vietnamese independence as a whole. For a long period he had gathered an army of 3000 warriors, who he regarded all as his adopted sons. He set up wrestling grounds, trained them in arts of warfare, and encouraged them to fight for their homeland with righteous, honourable purposes.

Lý Tiến, fearful, reported to the Southern Han king. That same year, Dương Đình Nghệ marched north and besieged the Southern Han Garrison in Dai La defeating the large Chinese army stationed there. The Southern Han king sent Commander Trình Bảo to reinforce Lý Tiến, although who at that stage had already abandoned his soldiers and fled back to China with his officials. Upon arrival Dương Đình Nghệ had already captured the fortified fortress, Trinh Bảo and his men besieged it, but Dương Đình Nghệ led a counter-attack and killed him. Dương Đình Nghệ taking the fortress, proclaimed himself the new Military Governor of Tĩnh Hải Quân, and drove all the remaining Chinese forces back to the border of China in the Jinghai Circuit, reassuming Vietnamese control of the prefectures.

== Death ==
In the spring, March of 937, Dương Đình Nghệ was unexpectedly murdered by one of his commanders, Kiều Công Tiễn, who turned traitor and took power for himself. The murder caused outrage, upon hearing the news his mentee and son-in-law general Ngô Quyền who was married to his daughter Dương Thị Ngọc, marched his army north to seek vengeance. In response to the attack, Kiều Công Tiễn appealed to Liu Yan, the emperor of Southern Han for Chinese reinforcement and foreign intervention, but he was defeated in combat and executed by Ngô Quyền before the army of Southern Han entered the country. This event set the stage for the Battle of Bạch Đằng (938) considered one of the greatest victories in Vietnamese history and the turning point for the countries history, where Ngô Quyền despite being greatly outnumbered defeated the invading Southern Han and ended nearly 1000 years of Chinese rule over Vietnam, securing Vietnamese independence.

== Legacy ==
Dương Đình Nghệ paved the way and inspired later Vietnamese leaders such as Ngô Quyền, Đinh Bộ Lĩnh, and Lê Hoàn to establish an independent, autonomous Đại Việt. Although Dương Đình Nghệ appeared only briefly in history, he was regarded as one of the most important and impactful Vietnamese figures in history. After his death, the Dương Clan retained influence, though indirectly, over the politics of the century. Successive leaders, Ngô Quyền, Đinh Bộ Lĩnh, Lê Hoàn, all married women of the Dương clan, and these Dương women played crucial roles in determining succession.

=== Assessments ===
According to historian Keith Weller Taylor, The Birth of Vietnam:

“While Khúc Thừa Mỹ pursued an idealized vision of Tang civilization, Dương Đình Nghệ was ready to engage in practical political power. He led the first awakening of ‘Vietnamese Power’ in the 10th century. As a son of Ái Châu, his respect for Chinese civilization was less than that of Khúc Thừa Mỹ, and in building a local authority against the Southern Han, he paved the way for the rapid development of Vietnamese national consciousness, gaining momentum through the three subsequent wars against China.”

Dương Đình Nghệ Born: ? Died: ?
Regnal titles
Preceded by Khúc Thừa Mỹ	Jiedushi of Tĩnh Hải quân 931–937	Succeeded by Kiều Công Tiễn
