= Khúc clan =

The Khúc family or Khúc clan (Vietnamese: Họ Khúc, chữ Nôm: 𣱆曲, Vietnamese: Khúc gia, chữ Hán: 曲家; Chinese: 曲家) was a succession of native leaders who ruled over Tĩnh Hải quân during the late Tang dynasty until the Five Dynasties period.

The Chinese Tang dynasty took control of the region of Jiaozhi (Giao Châu; roughly corresponding to the area of the modern Red River Delta) in 621 from the preceding Sui dynasty. Later, the Tang dynasty established 12 provinces and 59 districts under the Protectorate of Annan. Effective control exercised by the Tang dynasty lasted until the 10th century, when Khúc Thừa Dụ took over as jiedushi in 905. By 906 an autonomous region in Vietnam was established under the Khúc clan in Tống Bình (near modern-day Hanoi), paving the way for total Vietnamese independence from China under Đinh Bộ Lĩnh.

== Preconditions ==
The Tang took control of the northern Vietnamese region of Jiaozhi (Giao Chỉ; roughly corresponding to the area of the modern Red River Delta). Periodical rebellions have occurred in Annam in 828, 841, 858, 860, 880, involving more and more people every time. After every uprising Tang authorities were forced to retreat to China.

China have been torn apart by upheaving dynasties from 874, until 907 when the Five Dynasties and Ten Kingdoms period had started. Jiedushi (Tiết độ sứ) of Annam since 892, brother of marshal Zhou Juanzhong, Zhou Quanyu has failed to rule this land, he asked Tang to call him back. Instead of him brother of ex-first minister Du Sun was appointed as jiedushi. After two months of Du Sun's rule, commoners had started to call him "villain minister".

== Khúc Thừa Dụ (905–907) ==
Soon Du Sun was transferred to Hainan, and Vietnamese took their chance to uprise. Leader of a local clan, Khúc Thừa Dụ (曲承裕), came to take over the empty post. The weakened Tang dynasty now recognizes him and titles him tiết độ sứ of Tĩnh Hải quân.

== Khúc Thừa Hạo (907–917) ==
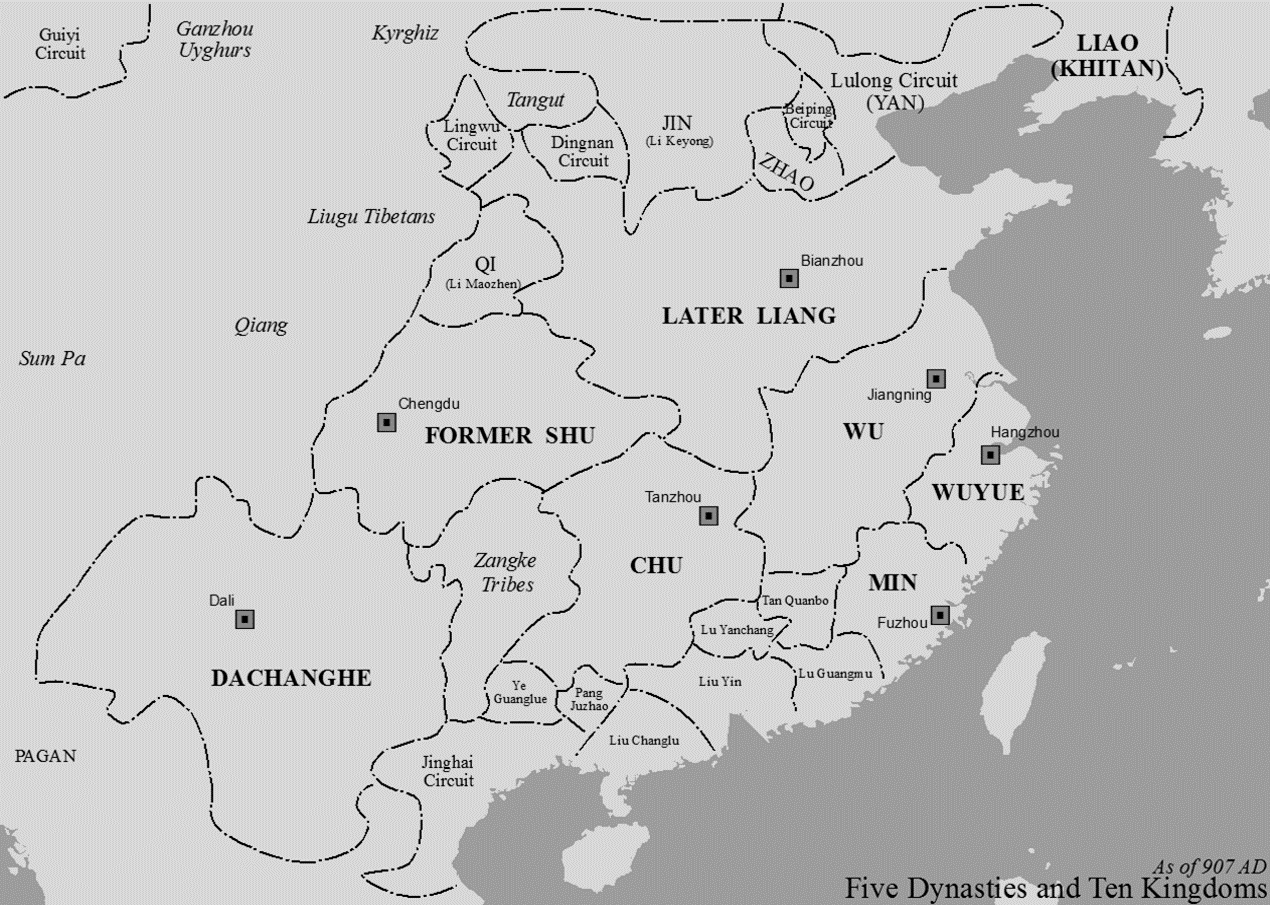
Map showing the location of Khúc clan (Jinghai Circuit)

July 23 of 907 Khúc Thừa Dụ died, his son Khúc Hạo became the new jiedushi tiết độ sứ. This time China legitimate ruler was the Later Liang, which acknowledged Khuc Hao, but gave title An Nam Tiết độ sứ to another mandarin in Guangzhou, to make Vietnamese remember Chinese territory claims.

Hao had handled several reforms, dividing his land to administrative districts lom phu, chiao, diap, xa. He also changed some of the local landlords, changed the taxing system. Tax collecting was flattened, homages were canceled. People loved his rule

== Khúc Thừa Mỹ (917–930) and decline ==
The next tiết độ sứ after Hao was his son Khúc Thừa Mỹ. Meanwhile, the Southern Han Dynasty was established in 917. Khúc Thừa Mỹ, being a Later Liang jiedushi, does not recognize the newly formed dynasty, hoping instead for assistance from the dwindling Later Liang court. This angers the Southern Han emperor and its ruler were willing to annex Annam once more. In 930, Southern Han sent an army to Annam, led by Li Shouyong and Liang Kezheng. Han soldiers captured Thừa Mỹ and occupied Tống Bình. Li Jin became Annam's jiedushi.

== Legacy ==
Although the Khúc did not declare themselves kings or emperors like many of other breakaway states during the Five Dynasties and Ten Kingdoms period, they had established more power for local rule than ever before. In 931, another Vietnamese native Dương Đình Nghệ, summoned a 3,000 strong army that took control of Tống Bình. Southern Han retreated again and this time for good. No other Chinese dynasty would have managed an established rule over Vietnam in the next five centuries, until the Ming dynasty invaded in 1407 and occupied Vietnam for 20 years.

| Preceded by Third Chinese domination of Vietnam | Ruler of Vietnam; 906–930 | Succeeded by Dương Đình Nghệ |
