= Khúc Thừa Mỹ =

Khúc Thừa Mỹ 曲承美
- Tĩnh Hải quân tiết độ sứ

Jiedushi of Tĩnh Hải quân
- Tenure: 917–920/930
- Predecessor: Khúc Hạo
- Successor: Dương Đình Nghệ
- Born: before 900; Tĩnh Hải quân, Tang China (modern-day Hải Dương province, Vietnam)
- Died: after 930; Southern Han
- House: Khúc clan
- Father: Khúc Hạo

Khúc Thừa Mỹ (chữ Hán: 曲承美; pinyin: Qū Chéngměi; governed: 918–923 or 918–930) was a self-declared jiedushi of Tĩnh Hải quân (modern northern Vietnam) during the later part of the Third Chinese domination of Vietnam, when China entered the chaotic Five Dynasties period. He succeeded his father Khúc Hạo and tried to maintain northern Vietnam's autonomy. His rule was officially recognized by the Later Liang, thus he came to conflict with Liu Yan, the ruler of Southern Han. The Southern Han invaded in 930, capturing the capital Đại La (present-day Hanoi) with no resistance, and Khúc Thừa Mỹ was taken to Canton, where he was placed under comfortable house arrest. Chinese rule in Vietnam was thereby reestablished.

Khúc Thừa Mỹ Born: ? Died: ?
Regnal titles
Preceded by Khúc Hạo	Jiedushi of Tĩnh Hải quân 917–920/930	Succeeded by Dương Đình Nghệ
