= Mai Thúc Loan =

Mai Thúc Loan 梅叔鸞
- Mai Hắc Đế (Mai the Black Emperor)
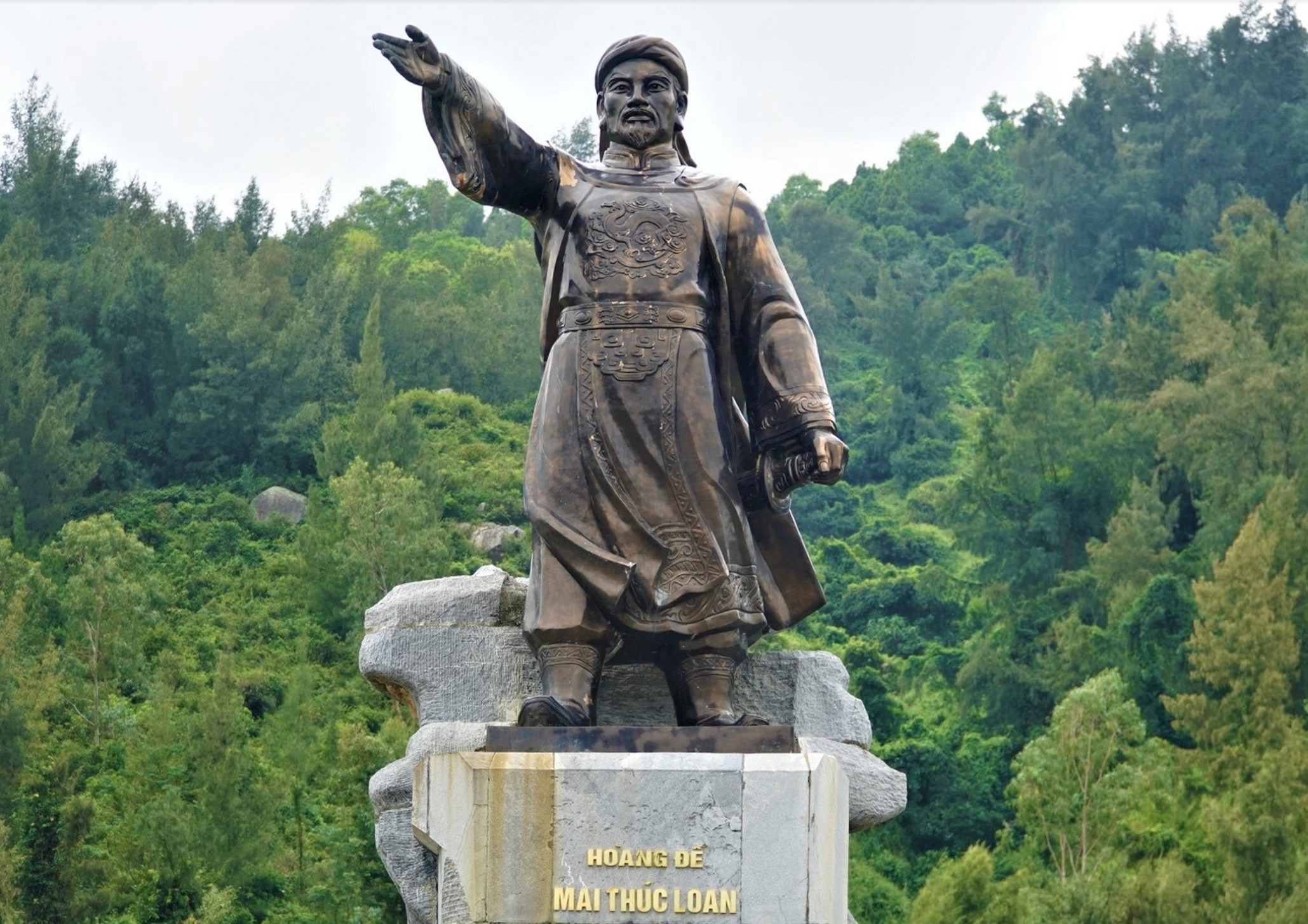

Emperor of Annam
- Reign: 722–723
- Successor: Rebellion crushed
- Born: 670; Thạch Hà, Hà Nội, Annan, Tang China
- Died: September 16, 723 (aged 52–53); Nghệ An, Annan, Tang China
Names
- Mai Thúc Loan (梅叔鸞); Mai Huyền Thành (梅玄成)
- Father: Mai
- Mother: Trúc

Mai Thúc Loan (or Mai Huyền Thành (梅玄成), self-proclaimed Mai Hắc Đế (梅黑帝, The Black Emperor or The Swarthy Emperor), was the Vietnamese leader of the uprising in 722 AD against the rule of the Chinese Tang dynasty in the provinces of Hoan Châu and Ái Châu (now Thanh Hóa and Nghệ An). Regarded as one of the major rebellions during the Third Chinese domination, the uprising of Mai Thúc Loan succeeded in capturing the capital Songping (now Hanoi) of the Tang's Annan protectorate and Mai Thúc Loan thus proclaimed himself Mai Hắc Đế, the emperor of the independent region for a short time before being put down by the military campaign after the order of the Emperor Xuanzong of Tang. Today Mai Thúc Loan is praised as one of the early national heroes in the history of Vietnam who contributed for the struggle for independence of the country.

== Background ==
According to Từ điển Bách khoa toàn thư Việt Nam, the date of birth of Mai Thúc Loan was unknown but he was from the Mai Phụ village, modern-day Thạch Hà District, Hà Tĩnh. In the Basic Records of the New Book of Tang, his name was Mai Thúc Loan while in the Old Book of Tang the name was recorded as Mai Huyền Thành and the one in the Zizhi Tongjian was Mai Thúc Yên.

== Uprising ==
In 722, Mai Thúc Loan rebelled in what is now Hà Tĩnh Province and proclaimed himself the "Swarthy Emperor" (Hắc Đế). According to Khâm định Việt sử Thông giám cương mục, the title Black Emperor originated from his distinctively dark skin colour. His rebellion rallied people from 23 counties with "400,000 followers". Many were peasants who roamed the countryside, plundering food and other items. He also allied with Champa and Chenla, an unknown kingdom named Jinlin (“Gold Neighbor”) and other unnamed kingdoms. A Chinese army of 100,000 from Guangdong under general Yang Zixu, including a "multitude" of mountain tribesmen who had remained loyal to the Tang, marched directly along the coast, following the old road built by Ma Yuan. Yang Zixu attacked Mai Thúc Loan by surprise and suppressed the rebellion in 723. The corpses of the Swarthy Emperor and his followers were piled up to form a huge mound and were left on public display to check further revolts.

== Legacy ==
The traditional record about Mai Thúc Loan's uprising in historical chronicales of Vietnamese dynasties was brief, for example the Đại Việt sử ký toàn thư of Ngô Sĩ Liên only acknowledged that there was a rebellion led by the rebel leader Mai Thúc Loan in 722 with the said army of 30,000 soldiers with allies from Champa, Lâm Ấp and that the rebellion was quickly pacified by Tang troops. In Khâm định Việt sử Thông giám cương mục, the total number of Mai Thúc Loan's forces was 40,000 but the compilers of the book expressed their doubt about this number and thought that it might be made by Tang generals who wanted to emphasize their victory over the uprising with the Emperor Xuanzong. While Đại Việt sử ký and Đại Việt sử ký toàn thư only regarded Mai Thúc Loan as a rebel (giặc) of the Tang authority, Ngô Thì Sĩ in Đại Việt sử ký tiền biên, compiled during the Tây Sơn dynasty, praised the uprising as a symbol of the independent spirit of Vietnamese people and thus criticized Lê Văn Hưu and Ngô Sĩ Liên for misjudging the real value of Mai Thúc Loan's rebellion.

Today Mai Thúc Loan is appreciated as one of the early national heroes in the history of Vietnam who contributed for the struggle for independence of the country. In the site of his ancient citadel of Vạn An, people erected a temple to worship Mai Thúc Loan and he was considered being equal with other Vietnamese emperors although his rule was short-lived and he was not officially called an emperor of Vietnam in dynastic historical books. According to folk legend, Mai Thúc Loan had a daughter named Mai Thị Cầu and a son named Mai Kỳ Sơn who followed their father in fighting against the Tang dynasty, today there still remains a shrine to worship Mai Thị Cầu and Mai Kỳ Sơn in Haiphong where people hold an annual festival in the third lunar month to celebrate the deeds of Mai Thúc Loan's children. A street of Hanoi and several places in Vietnam are named in honour of Mai Thúc Loan.

While modern Vietnamese national history views Mai Thúc Loan as a Vietnamese national leader, John D. Phan notes that he was only canonized much later in a revisionist project that made local cults orthodoxy. This was despite the fact that Mai Thúc Loan came from the periphery representing diverse but fringe cultural elements including the Chams and Khmers, and therefore neither a "local" of the Red River Plains or "proto-Vietnamese".

Mai Thúc Loan Born: ? Died: 723
Regnal titles
Preceded by Hậu Lý Nam Đế	Emperor of independent Vietnam; 722	Succeeded by Phùng Hưng
