= Khúc Hạo =

Khúc Hạo 曲顥
- Tĩnh Hải quân tiết độ sứ

Jiedushi of Tĩnh Hải quân
- Tenure: 907–917
- Predecessor: Khúc Thừa Dụ
- Successor: Khúc Thừa Mỹ
- Pretenders: Liu Yin (908–911); Liu Yan (913?–917)
- Born: 860; Ninh Giang, Hải Dương, Tĩnh Hải quân, Tang China
- Died: 917 (aged 56–57); Đại La, Tĩnh Hải quân
- Issue: Khúc Thừa Mỹ
- House: Khúc clan
- Father: Khúc Thừa Dụ

Khúc Hạo (860–917; Chinese: 曲顥; pinyin: Qū Hào) was the Vietnamese self-declared jiedushi of northern Vietnam (Tĩnh Hải quân) from 907 to 917 succeeding his father Khúc Thừa Dụ.

During his reign, Khúc Hạo made several important social and administrative reforms including a new system of administrative division, the levelling of cultivated land tax and the abolishment of corvée. Besides, Khúc Hạo maintained a discreet policy towards Chinese authorities and thus brought a period of stability and prosperity to his country. Khúc Hạo died in 917 and was succeeded by his son Khúc Thừa Mỹ who failed to keep the autonomy of Tĩnh Hải quân when he was defeated by the army of the kingdom of Southern Han in 923.

Khúc Hạo's rule is still considered by Vietnamese historians as a foundation for the administration of Vietnam following its independence.

== Background ==
The date of birth of Khúc Hạo was unknown but he came from the Khúc family which was a powerful clan with long history and tradition in Hồng Châu, Cúc Bồ (now Ninh Giang, Hải Dương, Vietnam). In early 10th century, the head of Khúc family Khúc Thừa Dụ succeeded in taking over the control of Tĩnh Hải quân (now the northern part of Vietnam) and became the first Jiedushi of native origin that marked the beginning of the independence of Vietnam, because while the country still nominally belonged to the Tang dynasty, it had now a status of autonomy with a native ruler who could decide matters without any interference from China.

== History ==
As the son of Khúc Thừa Dụ, Khúc Hạo began to hold the position Jiedushi in 907 after his father's death and continue to consolidate the autonomy of the country. On the other hand, in old historical books such as the Đại Việt sử lược or Đại Việt sử ký toàn thư, it was Khúc Hạo, instead of Khúc Thừa Dụ, who was mentioned as the first member of the Khúc family holding the position Jiedushi, according to Đại Việt sử lược, he succeeded this title from the Chinese Jiedushi named Độc Cô Tồn while in Đại Việt sử ký toàn thư, Khúc Hạo self-entitled him Jiedushi after rising a revolt that took control over Tĩnh Hải quân. After Keith Weller Taylor, since the power was smoothly transferred from Khúc Thừa Dụ to his son Khúc Hạo and there is no indication of struggle or political conflict in the period from 880 to 906, one can reason that the Khúc family was actually in control of the country throughout these years.

In the position of ruler of Tĩnh Hải quân, Khúc Hạo made several important social and administrative reforms. He decided to change the basic administrative unit from hương (township), which was established during the Tang dynasty, to giáp. For each giáp, Khúc Hạo appointed a quản giáp (supervisor of giáp) and a phó tri giáp (deputy-supervisor of giáp) to keep the control, a system of family register (sổ hộ) was also created in order to collect accurate statistics of population and manpower of the country. Other important social changes initiated by Khúc Hạo were the levelling of cultivated land tax (thuế ruộng) and the abolishment of corvée (lực dịch). The reign of Khúc Hạo was praised for its tolerance and simplicity towards common people, hence Tĩnh Hải quân had a period of stability and prosperity. In regard to relation with Chinese authorities, Khúc Hạo maintained a discreet policy towards the new Later Liang which continued to accept the autonomous reign of the Khúc family by giving Khúc Hạo the title Jiedushi of the Protectorate General to Pacify the South (An Nam đô hộ sung Tiết độ sứ) in the ninth month of 907. However, in the next year, Later Liang appointed Liu Yin, the warlord who ruled Qinghai Circuit (清海, headquartered in modern Guangzhou, Guangdong), as Jiedushi of Tĩnh Hải quân, meaning the Chinese still wanted to regain control of Vietnam. Khúc Hạo assigned his own son Khúc Thừa Mỹ to the position of ambassador in Guangzhou with the mission of not only keeping a good relation with the northern country but also studying the real situation in China at the time.

Khúc Hạo deceased in 917 and was succeeded by his son Khúc Thừa Mỹ who failed to keep the autonomy of Tĩnh Hải quân when he refused to acknowledge allegiance to the newly established kingdom of Southern Han and afterwards was defeated by the army of this kingdom in 923 or 930. Nevertheless, Dương Đình Nghệ, who was a subordinate of the Khúc family, quickly restored the indigenous control of the country in 931. In the Đại Việt sử lược, Khúc Thừa Mỹ was recorded as younger brother, not son, of Khúc Hạo but from the Đại Việt sử ký toàn thư in the Lê dynasty, Ngô Sĩ Liên wrote that Khúc Hạo was Khúc Thừa Mỹ's father.

== Legacy ==
Today Khúc Hạo is still regarded as one of the first rulers of an independent Vietnam, a street in Hanoi and other places are named in honour of Khúc Hạo.

Khúc Hạo Born: 860 Died: 917
Regnal titles
Preceded by Khúc Thừa Dụ	Jiedushi of Tĩnh Hải quân 907–917	Succeeded by Khúc Thừa Mỹ
