= Liêu Hữu Phương =

Vietnamese Tang dynasty poet (fl. 9th century)

Liêu Hữu Phương (Chữ Hán: 廖有方; Chinese pinyin: Liào Yǒufāng; Wade–Giles: Liao^{4} Yu^{3}-fang^{1}), Chinese name Liao Yuqīng (fl. 9th century), was a poet and government official of the Tang dynasty during the early 9th century AD.

== Biography ==
Liêu Hữu Phương was of Vietnamese ethnicity. He was born in Jiao prefecture (modern-day Hanoi), Protectorate General to Pacify the South, when Vietnam was part of the Tang dynasty. Little was known about his early life.

The Tang imperial system allowed for some promotion by merit and could even be strikingly trans-ethnic. At this time, however, Confucianism ideas had very little impact on the indigenous people of North Vietnam. A Tang official wrote dismissively in 845: "Annan has produced no more than eight imperial officials; senior graduates have not exceeded ten."

In 815, Liêu Hữu Phương took a 1,450-mile journey from Hanoi to Chang'an, the capital of the Tang dynasty, to take the Tang imperial examination, but he failed. He then took a trip to Shu, modern-day Sichuan Province, to visit a fellow student. In the next year, he again participated in the civil service examination and passed it. He was appointed as a librarian at the imperial court.

His poems are now lost; his On a Stranger’s Coffin: A Poem Engraved on the Occasion of Burying a Scholar at Baoqe in Quan Tang Shi is the only preserved one and the oldest extant poem written in Chinese by a Vietnamese.

In the tenth year of Yuanhe (815), I failed the examinations [at Ch’ang-an, the T'ang capital in northern China]. I traveled in the west and came to the Baoqe district. There I was surprised to hear the sound of someone groaning. I inquired about that person's distress. He replied: "I have coiled through many examinations but have not yet found favor." Then he knocked his head on the floor. I talked with him for a long time. His replies were prompt and bitter. Unable to say more, he suddenly leaned to one side and died. I immediately sold my horse to a village notable and bought a coffin for his burial. Alas, I did not even know his name! I took a path through the mountains and sadly laid him to rest. Later, I returned with an inscription:

Alas, the gentleman died; reduced to extremities, he abandoned the world.
How many rules weary the heart; brush, ink, the examination yard.
But briefly acquainted, I offer a little sadness,
Without knowing where his family’s village stands.

== See also ==
- Jiang Gongfu (731–805), a Chinese poet born in Annan

== Works cited ==
- Kornicki, Peter (2017), "Sino-Vietnamese literature", in Li, Wai-yee; Denecke, Wiebke; Tian, Xiaofen (eds.), The Oxford Handbook of Classical Chinese Literature (1000 BCE-900 CE), Oxford: Oxford University Press, pp. 568–578, ISBN 0-199-35659-9
- Taylor, Keith Weller (1983). The Birth of the Vietnam. University of California Press. ISBN 978-0-520-07417-0.
- Kiernan, Ben (2019). Việt Nam: a history from earliest time to the present. Oxford University Press. ISBN 978-0-190-05379-6.
