= Lý Do Độc =

Chieftain of the Taohua tribe

- Other names: Lord of the Seven Wan and Ravines
- Occupation: Rebel leader

Lý Do Độc (chữ Hán: 李由獨; ? – ?), known in Chinese as Li Youdu (Wade–Giles: Li Yu-tu) was a chieftain of a tribe called Taohua and a rebel leader in Phong around mid-9th century, during the Third Chinese domination of Vietnam. Phong (modern-day Phú Thọ Province) back then was the boundary area between Tang empire's Annan Protectorate and the kingdom of Nanzhao in modern-day Yunnan. Lý Do Độc himself commanding a local army of 6,000 and was assisted by seven "Lords of the Ravines."

The Annan governor, Li Zhuo (r. 853–857) refused to entrust Lý Do Độc, unfortunately pushed Lý Do Độc into closer ties with Nanzhao, the contemporary enemy of the Tang. In 857, Lý Do Độc and his "Lords of the Ravines" submitted to Nanzhao. King Meng Shilong of Nanzhao sent a military commander to deliver a letter to Do Độc soliciting his submission. Lý Do Độc and the Lords of the Ravine accepted the offer of vassalage by the Nanzhao king. The Yunnanese commander married his niece or daughter off to Lý Do Độc's younger son, and this young man in return became a junior official of the Nanzhao court.

Lý Do Độc and other disaffected mountain tribes openly sided with Nanzhao, formed a "suicide squad in white clothes" (baiyi mengmin yun) and teamed up with the Yunnanese forces, joined with lowland people that brought warfare to villages in the heart of the protectorate. Chaos and riots ravaged northern Vietnam until they were briefly calmed in 858 by the arrival of the new governor Wang Shi.

== Bibliography ==
- Kiernan, Ben (2019). Việt Nam: a history from earliest time to the present. Oxford University Press.
- Wang, Zhenping (2013), Tang China in Multi-Polar Asia: A History of Diplomacy and War, University of Hawaii Press
- Schafer, Edward Hetzel (1967), The Vermilion Bird: T'ang Images of the South, Los Angeles: University of California Press, ISBN 978-0-520-01145-8
- Taylor, Keith Weller (1983), The Birth of the Vietnam, University of California Press
