= Khúc Thừa Dụ =

Khúc Thừa Dụ 曲承裕
- Tĩnh Hải quân tiết độ sứ

Jiedushi of Tĩnh Hải quân
- Tenure: 905–907
- Predecessor: Dugu Sun (de jure)
- Successor: Khúc Hạo
- Born: 830; Ninh Giang, Hải Dương, Tĩnh Hải quân, Tang China
- Died: July 23, 907 (aged 76–77); Đại La, Tĩnh Hải quân
- Issue: Khúc Hạo
- House: Khúc clan

Khúc Thừa Dụ (Chinese: 曲承裕; pinyin: Qū Chéngyù) or Khúc Tiên chủ (曲先主) (830–907) was a jiedushi of Tĩnh Hải quân, nominally under the Chinese Tang dynasty, in the early 10th century.

Khúc Thừa Dụ was the head of the Khúc family in Hải Dương and was well known by people in the region for his wealth and benevolence. Khúc Thừa Dụ began to rule the region when the Tang dynasty entered its final stage of collapse, and is considered the ruler who marked the beginning of an independent Vietnam, which had until then been ruled by China. When he died in 907, his position was inherited by his son Khúc Hạo who continued to strengthen the autonomy and prosperity of the region.

== History ==
According to Từ điển Bách khoa toàn thư Việt Nam, the date of birth of Khúc Thừa Dụ was unknown but he was from Hồng Châu, Cúc Bồ (now Ninh Giang, Hải Dương, Vietnam). The Khúc family of which Khúc Thừa Dụ was a member was a powerful clan with a long history and tradition in Hồng Châu. It was said that Khúc Thừa Dụ was known for his hospitality and generosity that made him an admired figure by people in the region. Keith Weller Taylor in his The Birth of Vietnam wrote that this background information about Khúc Thừa Dụ appeared in the 18th century in an unofficial source (dã sử) therefore one cannot draw firm conclusions from it.

In the early 10th century, the Tang dynasty began to fall into chaos and could not hold its authority in Tĩnh Hải quân (now northern Vietnam) when the Chinese jiedushi Zeng Gun with his soldiers had to abandon the region in 880. From 880 to 905, the Tang appointed a series of short-term governors, none of whom actually held power in the region. Eventually, Khúc Thừa Dụ claimed the position jiedushi of Tĩnh Hải quân which marked the beginning of the independence of Vietnam. While Vietnam still nominally belonged to the Tang dynasty, it was now autonomous with a native ruler who could decide matters without any interference from China. As the Tang dynasty did not have any more strength to begin a military campaign against Tĩnh Hải quân, the Tang emperor had to accept the autonomy of that region by giving Khúc Thừa Dụ the title of chancellor (đồng bình chương sự), as well as his position of jiedushi in the first month of 906. This appointment was recorded in Sima Guang's Zizhi Tongjian, and it was the first time Khúc Thừa Dụ was mentioned in Chinese historical records.

Khúc Thừa Dụ died in the seventh month of 907 and was succeeded by his son Khúc Hạo who continued to consolidate the autonomy of Tĩnh Hải quân. For his achievement, Khúc Thừa Dụ was respectfully called by people Khúc Tiên chủ or Khúc Tiên chúa (曲先主; Qū Xiānzhǔ; 'Khúc [Qū] the First Master [or King]') and he is still worshipped in a temple dedicated to him in his native province. On the other hand, in old historical books such as Đại Việt sử lược or Đại Việt sử ký toàn thư, it was Khúc Hạo, instead of Khúc Thừa Dụ, who was mentioned as the first member of the Khúc family holding the position jiedushi. According to Đại Việt sử lược, he took over the title from another jiedushi named Dugu Sun while in Đại Việt sử ký toàn thư, Khúc Hạo appointed himself jiedushi after starting a revolt that took control of Tĩnh Hải quân. Trần Trọng Kim in his Việt Nam sử lược believed that it was Khúc Thừa Dụ who started a revolt and claimed the title. Keith Weller Taylor argued that since the power was smoothly transferred from Khúc Thừa Dụ to his son Khúc Hạo and there was no indication of political conflict between 880 and 906, one can reason that the Khúc family was actually in control of the country throughout those years.

Khúc Thừa Dụ Born: ? Died: 907
Regnal titles
Preceded by Dugu Sun	Jiedushi of Tĩnh Hải quân (Jinghai Circuit); 905–907	Succeeded by Khúc Hạo
