= Đỗ Anh Hàn =

Đỗ Anh Hàn (chữ Hán: 杜英翰; ? – 791), known in Chinese as Du Yinghan (Wade–Giles: Tu Ying-han) was a chief in Phong, Tang Annan, in late 8th century who with Phùng Hưng led a revolt against the Tang dynasty during the Third Chinese domination of Vietnam in May 785, due to Chinese governor Gao Zhengping's doubling of taxes.

The Chinese retook the region in 791 and had Du Yinghan killed.

== Bibliography ==
- Schafer, Edward Hetzel (1967), The Vermilion Bird: T'ang Images of the South, Los Angeles: University of California Press, ISBN 978-0-520-01145-8
- Taylor, Keith Weller (1983), The Birth of the Vietnam, University of California Press, ISBN 978-0-520-07417-0
- Salmon, Claudine (2004), "Tang-Viet society as reflected in a Buddhist bell inscription", in Shing, Müller; Höllmann, Thomas O. (eds.), Archäologie und Frühe Texte, Germany: Harrassowitz, pp. 195–216, ISBN 978-3-447-05060-9
