= Tĩnh Hải quân =

Tang Dynasty administrative division of China

Jinghai Prefecture 靜海軍 Tĩnh Hải quân
- 866–967
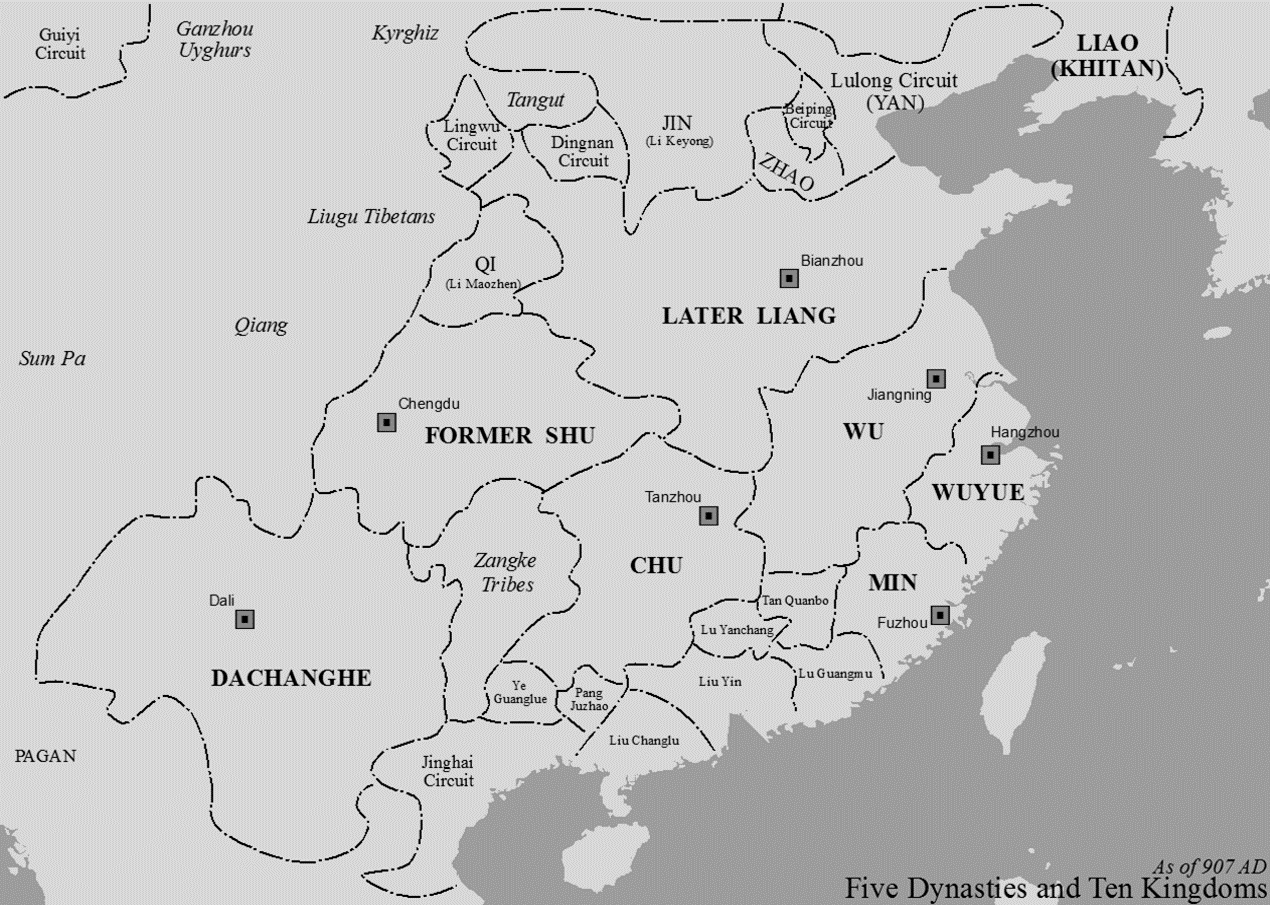
- Jinghai Prefecture at the bottom in modern Northern Vietnam and Southern China
- Status: Fanzhen of the Tang dynasty (866–880); Semi-independent jiedushi nominally under Tang dynasty (905–907); Independent kingdom (939–967)
- Capital: Đại La (Hanoi) (866–939); Cổ Loa (939–967)
- Common languages: Middle Chinese, Old Vietnamese, Muong
- Religion: Vietnamese folk religion, Buddhism, Taoism
- Government: Military governor (866–938); Monarchy (939–967)
- Historical era: Postclassical Era
  - Established: 866
  - Disestablished: 967
Preceded by
Annan (Tang protectorate)
Succeeded by
Đại Việt
Đinh dynasty
Dali Kingdom

Tĩnh Hải quân

Chinese name
- Traditional Chinese: 靜海軍
- Simplified Chinese: 靜海軍
- Literal meaning: Peaceful Sea Army [Region]
Transcriptions
Standard Mandarin
- Hanyu Pinyin: Jìnghǎi Jūn
- Wade–Giles: Ching-hai Chün

Vietnamese name
- Vietnamese alphabet: Tĩnh Hải quân
- Chữ Hán: 靜海軍

Annam
- Chinese: 安南
- Literal meaning: Pacified South
Transcriptions
Standard Mandarin
- Hanyu Pinyin: Ānnán
- Wade–Giles: An-nan

Vietnamese name
- Vietnamese alphabet: An Nam
- Chữ Hán: 安南

History of Vietnam
(by names of Vietnam)
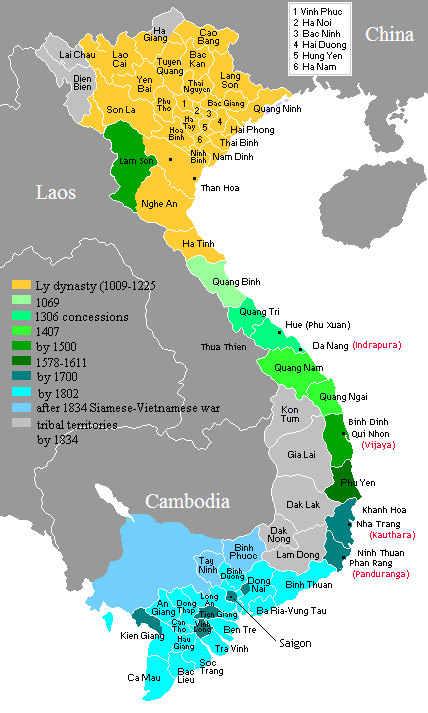

~2879–2524 BC	Xích Quỷ (Note: legendary)
~700–258 BC	Văn Lang
257–179 BC	Âu Lạc
204–111 BC	Nam Việt
111 BC – 40 AD	Giao Chỉ
40–43	Lĩnh Nam
43–203	Giao Chỉ
203–544	Giao Châu
544–602	Vạn Xuân
602–679	Giao Châu
679–757	An Nam
757–766	Trấn Nam
766–866	An Nam
866–968	Tĩnh Hải quân
968–1054	Đại Cồ Việt
1054–1400	Đại Việt
1400–1407	Đại Ngu
1407–1427	Giao Chỉ
1428–1804	Đại Việt
1804–1839	Việt Nam
1839–1945	Đại Nam
1887–1954	Đông Dương
1945–	Việt Nam
Main template
History of Vietnam

Tĩnh Hải quân or Jinghai Prefecture was an administrative division of the Tang dynasty of China administered by Chinese governors, which then later became a quasi-independent regime ruled by successive local Vietnamese warlords and monarchs. It was centered around what is now northern Vietnam from 866 to 967 during the late Tang period and lasted until the late Five Dynasties and Ten Kingdoms period when Đinh Bộ Lĩnh established the Đinh dynasty.

== History ==
=== Chinese period ===
Jinghai Prefecture (Tĩnh Hải quân) was created in 866 by the Chinese general Gao Pian as a Tang fanzhen ("buffer town") in the former Annan Duhufu (Protectorate General to Pacify the South) after retaking it from Nanzhao, which had invaded and captured the area in 863. The area of the command was sometimes referred to as "circuit" (道, dao). In 875, the Huang Chao rebellion broke out in northern China. In 879, the rebels sacked Guangzhou, headed north, bypassing Guangxi and northern Vietnam. A campaign against local aboriginals in Jinghai was conducted from 874 to 879. In 880, the army in Đại La mutinied, forcing the commander Zeng Gun to flee north, ending de facto Chinese control. Tang troops returned north in small groups of their own initiative. From 880 to 905, named holders of the post never actually governed Jinghai. In 904, Zhu Wen's brother Quanyu tried to enter the region but was immediately dismissed the next year for being "stupid and without ability."

=== Autonomous period ===
In 905, the native chief Khúc Thừa Dụ of the Khúc clan came to power and proclaimed himself jiedushi. In 907, his son Khúc Hạo (Chu Hao) succeeded as governor and was recognized by the Later Liang dynasty in northern China. In southern China, the powerful Liu Yin ruled over Guangzhou and was a close ally of Zhu Quanzhong. In 908 Khúc Hạo sent his son Khúc Thừa Mỹ to Guangzhou to gather information on the Liu family. When Liu Yin died in 911, Thừa Mỹ sent gifts to the Later Liang court by a naval envoy from the Min Kingdom. In the fifth month of the year, Liu Yin's brother and successor was named military governor at Guangzhou only. In the last month of the year, an imperial envoy arrived at Đại La to confirm Thừa Mỹ as military governor there. The Vietnamese Khúc family maintained a relationship with the Later Liang court through the Min state in Fujian. Wang Shenzhi called Thừa Mỹ's envoys "southern barbarian merchants".

In 917, Liu Yan proclaimed himself emperor of Southern Han. In 923, the Later Liang dynasty collapsed, so the Khúc family could no longer look north for legal and moral support. The Southern Han at Guangzhou controlled all of the Xi River basin; they were eager to add Tĩnh Hải quân to their realm and to reassemble the ancient inheritance of Zhao Tuo’s kingdom of Nanyue. In October 930, Liu Yan sent an army to occupy Đại La and met no resistance. Khúc Thừa Mỹ was captured and taken to Guangzhou, where he was allowed to live out his days quietly. In 931, a former vassal of the Khúc family, Dương Đình Nghệ from Aizhou (modern-day Thanh Hoá and Nghệ An), raised a 3,000-men army of retainers whom he called his adopted sons. Dương Đình Nghệ attacked the Southern Han army. The Southern Han general, Cheng Bao, failed to retake Tĩnh Hải from Dương Đình Nghệ and therefore he was decapitated.

Dương Đình Nghệ ruled Tĩnh Hải for 6 years. In 937, he was assassinated by Kiều Công Tiễn, a military subject who had given his allegiance to the Southern Han state and seized power. Ngô Quyền, a former general and son-in-law of Dương Đình Nghệ, marched north from Ai to avenge the death of his patron. The pro-Southern Han Kiều Công Tiễn called Liu Yan for help. Liu Yan placed his own son, Liu Hongcao, in command of the expedition, granting him the titles Jinghai jiedushi and King of Jiao, sailed to the coast of Annam and headed inland up the Bạch Đằng River, a northern arm of the Red River delta, to confront Ngô Quyền. Liu Yan himself set out from Guangdong, following his son's fleet with additional forces. In late 938, Ngô Quyền defeated the Southern Han fleet on the river by using barriers of sharpened stakes. When hearing the news that Liu Hongcao was killed, Liu Yan cried bitterly and withdrew his own fleet and returned to Guangzhou.

=== Independence ===
In February 939, Ngô Quyền abolished the title of military governor and proclaimed himself king, with the ancient town of Cổ Loa as his royal capital. Although he had defeated the Chinese dynasty of Southern Han, the government Ngô Quyền established afterward still largely followed a Chinese template down to the color of dress, which increasingly alienated his Viet subjects. He died in 944 and was succeeded by his brother-in-law Dương Tam Kha, who styled himself the "King of Peace" (Binh Vuong). Tam Kha was part of the anti-Chinese faction while Ngô Quyền's sons were still part of the Chinese-influenced elite. Ngô Quyền's eldest son, Ngô Xương Ngập, fled to the Nam Sách River area, which was the center of Chinese settlement and influence, and enlisted the help of Pham Bach Ho, a prominent member of a local noble family. He was also aided by Kiều Công Hãn, who came from the same family as Kiều Công Tiễn and held a grudge against the Dương family. Tam Kha tried to manipulate Ngô Quyền's second son, Ngô Xương Văn, by adopting him and making him a military leader. In 950, Xương Văn enlisted the aid of Đỗ Cảnh Thạc and deposed Tam Kha. Xương Văn declared himself the "King of Southern Jin" in imitation of Chinese dynasties. In 951, Xương Văn invited his brother Xương Ngập to rule alongside him but Xương Ngập usurped his rule and declared himself "King of the Heavenly Plan" (Thien Sack Vuong). Ngập died in 954 and Văn returned to the throne. He sent envoys to Guangzhou bearing tribute and requesting credentials from Southern Han. However Xương Ngập then cancelled a visit from a Southern Han official before he could arrive.

=== Anarchy of the 12 Warlords ===
From 951, Duke Đinh Bộ Lĩnh of Hoa Lư began challenging royal authority. As the two kings prepared to march against Hoa Lư, Bộ Lĩnh sent his son Đinh Liễn as a hostage of good faith. The Ngô brothers responded by denouncing Bộ Lĩnh for not coming in person, securing Liễn, and proceeding to attack Hoa Lư. After Liễn escaped back to Hoa Lư, Bộ Lĩnh moved to make an alliance with Trần Lãm, a merchant and warlord of Cantonese origin. In 965, king Xương Văn campaigned against a pair of villages on the border of Phong. While observing the battle from a boat in the river, he was shot and killed by a crossbowman lying in ambush. After Xương Văn's death, warlords across northern Vietnam enlisted their own armies and took control the land. The kingdom dissolved into civil war, known as the Anarchy of the 12 Warlords. In the same year, Bộ Lĩnh subdued and mobilized Ô man tribes in the west, then attacked warlord Ngô Nhật Khánh in Sơn Tây with 30,000 troops. Having gained the submission of Ngô Nhật Khánh, the grandson of Ngô Quyền, Bộ Lĩnh's force marched northwest in 966 and defeated warlord Kiều Công Hãn. Two years later, he defeated all the warlords, proclaimed himself emperor of Đại Cồ Việt or Đại Việt and moved the Vietnamese capital to Hoa Lư.

== Administrative divisions ==
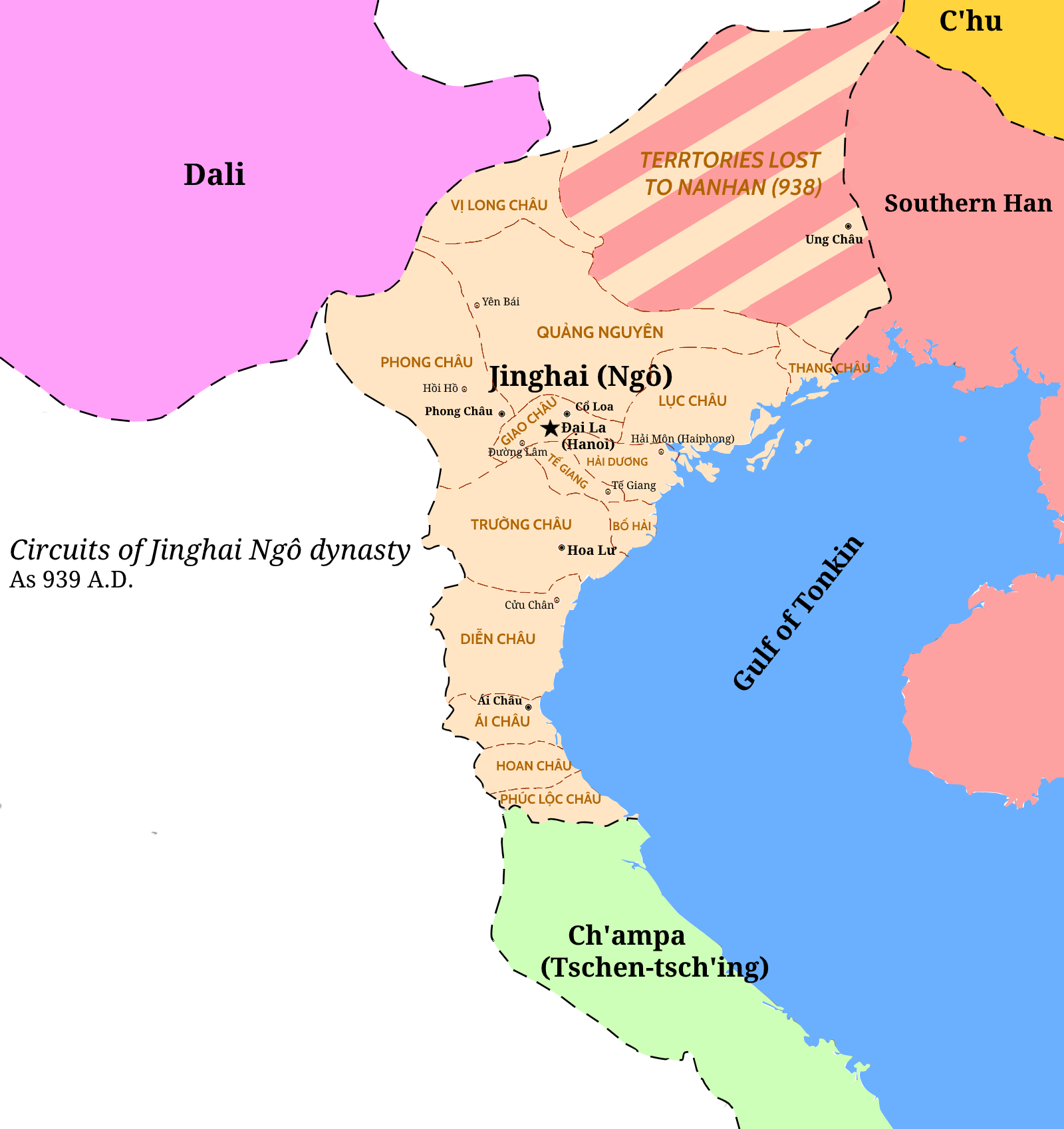
Ngô-ruled Jinghai in 938

- Giao Châu (Chinese: Jiāozhōu/交州)
- La Châu (Chinese: Luózhōu/羅州)
- Vũ An Châu (Chinese: Wǔānzhōu/武安州)
- Phong Châu (Chinese: Fēngzhōu/峰州)
- Trường Châu (Chinese: Chángzhōu/長州)
- Ái Châu (Chinese: Àizhōu/愛州)
- Diễn Châu (Chinese: Yǎnzhōu/演州)
- Hoan Châu (Chinese: Huānzhōu/驩州)
- Phúc Lộc Châu (Chinese: Fúlùzhōu/福祿州)

== List of rulers ==
=== List of Jiedushis (Tiết Độ Sứ) ===
- Gao Pian (高駢) (864–866): appointed in 864 as military Jinglueshi of Annan. Besieging Jiaozhou in war with Nanzhao.
- Wang Yanquan (王晏權) (866)
- Gao Pian (866–868): second tenure after successful retaking of Jiaozhou.
- Gao Xun (高潯) (868–873) (Gao Xun was Gao Pian's nephew)
- Zeng Gun (曾袞) (878–880): left post in 880 either due to a Nanzhao's invasion or to a rebellion. Some sources such as the Nguyễn dynasty's chronicle state that he held post until 905 AD, making him the last Chinese-appointed jiedushi actually stationed at post.
- Gao Maoqing (高茂卿) (882)
- Xie Zhao (謝肇) (884)
- An Youquan (安友權) (897–900)
- Sun Dezhao (孫德昭) (901) (titular only, did not assume office)
- Zhu Quanyu (朱全昱) (905) (Zhu Quanyu was the brother of Zhu Wen, Emperor of Later Liang, did not assume office)
- Dugu Sun (獨孤損) (905) (did not assume office)
- Khúc Thừa Dụ (905–907) (self-proclaimed; later recognized by Tang)
- Khúc Hạo (907–917) (de facto; recognized by Later Liang from 907 to 908)
- Liu Yin (劉隱) (908–911, appointed by Later Liang but never assumed office)
- Liu Yan (劉龑) (913?–917, appointed by Later Liang but never assumed office)
- Khúc Thừa Mỹ (917–930)
- Dương Đình Nghệ (931–937; self-proclaimed)
- Kiều Công Tiễn (937–938; self-proclaimed)
- Liu Hongcao (劉弘操) (938, appointed by Southern Han; killed in action)

=== Monarchs ===
- Ngô Quyền (939–944); proclaimed as the Grand Prince
- Dương Tam Kha (944–950)
- Ngô Xương Ngập (950–954) and Ngô Xương Văn (950–965; co-rulers)
- Ngô Xương Xí (965–966)
- Đinh Tiên Hoàng (968-979); proclaimed as Emperor of Đại Cồ Việt (Đinh dynasty)
- Đinh Liễn; son of Đinh Tiên Hoàng, he received the titular Jiedushi of Tĩnh Hải in 973 and promoted to the title Prince of Jiaozhi by the Song emperor from 975 to his death in 979.

== Bibliography ==
- Chapuis, Oscar (1995). A history of Vietnam: from Hong Bang to Tu Duc. Greenwood Publishing Group. ISBN 0-313-29622-7.
- Coedes, George (2015). The Making of South East Asia (RLE Modern East and South East Asia). Taylor & Francis.
- Elverskog, Johan (2011). Buddhism and Islam on the Silk Road. University of Pennsylvania Press.
- Hall, Daniel George Edward (1981), History of South East Asia, Macmillan Education, Limited, ISBN 978-1-349-16521-6
- Kasimin, Amran (1991), Religion and social change among the indigenous people of the Malay Peninsula, Dewan Bahasa dan Pustaka, Kementerian Pendidikan Malaysia, ISBN 9-8362-2265-0
- Kiernan, Ben (2019). Việt Nam: a history from earliest time to the present. Oxford University Press.
- Lau, Nap-yin; Huang, K’uan-Chung (1986), "Founding and consolidation of the Sung Dynasty", in Twitchett, Denis; Fairbank, John K. (eds.), The Cambridge History of China: Volume 5, The Sung Dynasty and Its Precursors, 907-1279, Part 1, Cambridge: Cambridge University Press, pp. 225–265
- Schafer, Edward Hetzel (1967), The Vermilion Bird: T'ang Images of the South, Los Angeles: University of California Press
- Taylor, Keith W. (2013). A History of the Vietnamese. Cambridge University Press.
- Taylor, Keith Weller (1983), The Birth of the Vietnam, University of California Press
- Taylor, K. W. (1986), "Authority and Legitimacy in 11th Cen. Vietnam", in Milner, Anthony Crothers; Marr, David G. (eds.), Southeast Asia in the 9th to 14th Centuries, Cambridge: Institute of Southeast Asian Studies
- Xiu, Ouyang (1995). Historical Records of the Five Dynasties. Beijing: Zhonghua Book Company. ISBN 978-7-101-00322-2.
