= Annan (Tang protectorate) =

Imperial Chinese territory (679–866) in present-day Vietnam

Protectorate General to Pacify the South 安南都護府 Ānnán Dūhùfǔ An Nam đô hộ phủ
- 679–866
- Territory of Tang dynasty at its peak in 661, Protectorate General to Pacify the South is labelled in the bottom
- Status: Imperial protectorate of the Tang dynasty and Wu Zhou dynasty
- Capital: Songping (La Thành, and later Đại La)
- Common languages: Austroasiatic languages; Kra–Dai languages; Tibeto-Burman languages; Early Middle Chinese
- Religion: Mahayana Buddhism, Taoism, Animism
- Government: Monarchy
- Emperor of the Tang dynasty
  - 649–683: Emperor Gaozong of Tang
  - 859–873: Emperor Yizong of Tang (Last)
- Duhu (Protectorate-governor)
  - 684–687: Liu Yanyou
  - 862–863 (last): Cai Xi
- Historical era: Early Middle Ages
  - Established: 679
  - Lý Tự Tiên's rebellion: 687
  - Mai Thúc Loan's rebellion: 722
  - Nanzhao invasions: 864–866
  - To Jinghai circuit: 866
Preceded by	Succeeded by
Jiaozhou	Tĩnh Hải quân

Annan

Chinese name
- Traditional Chinese: 安南都護府
- Simplified Chinese: 安南都护府
Transcriptions
Standard Mandarin
- Hanyu Pinyin: Ānnán Dūhùfǔ
- Wade–Giles: An^{1}-nam^{1} Tu^{1}-hu^{4}-fu^{3}

Vietnamese name
- Vietnamese alphabet: An Nam đô hộ phủ
- Chữ Hán: 安南都護府

History of Vietnam
(by names of Vietnam)
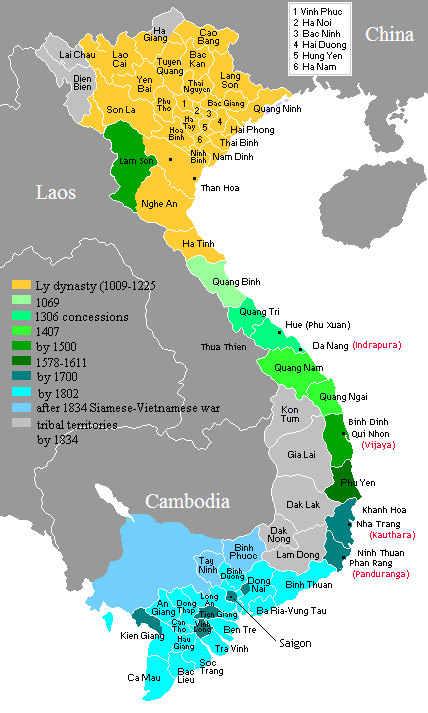

~2879–2524 BC	Xích Quỷ (Note: legendary)
~700–258 BC	Văn Lang
257–179 BC	Âu Lạc
204–111 BC	Nam Việt
111 BC – 40 AD	Giao Chỉ
40–43	Lĩnh Nam
43–203	Giao Chỉ
203–544	Giao Châu
544–602	Vạn Xuân
602–679	Giao Châu
679–757	An Nam
757–766	Trấn Nam
766–866	An Nam
866–968	Tĩnh Hải quân
968–1054	Đại Cồ Việt
1054–1400	Đại Việt
1400–1407	Đại Ngu
1407–1427	Giao Chỉ
1428–1804	Đại Việt
1804–1839	Việt Nam
1839–1945	Đại Nam
1887–1954	Đông Dương
1945–	Việt Nam
Main template
History of Vietnam

The Annan Duhufu Chinese: 安南都護府; pinyin: Ānnán Dūhùfǔ; Vietnamese: An Nam đô hộ phủ, "Protectorate General to Pacify the South") shortened as Annan ( Vietnamese: An Nam) was an imperial protectorate and the southernmost administrative division of the Tang dynasty and Wu Zhou dynasty of China from 679 to 866, located in modern-day Vietnam.

In 679, the Annan Protectorate replaced the Jiaozhou Protectorate (Chinese: 交州; pinyin: Jiāozhōu) , also known as Jiaozhi (Chinese: 交趾; pinyin: Jiāozhǐ; Vietnamese: Giao Chỉ), with its seat situated in Songping County (宋平縣) (modern Hanoi). Annan was renamed to Zhennan for a brief period from 757 to 760 before reverting to Annan.

After coming under attack by Nanzhao in 864, the Annan Protectorate was renamed Jinghai Military Command (C. Jinghaiguan; V. Tĩnh Hải quân) upon its reconquest by Gao Pian in 866. Today the same area is sometimes known as Tonkin (Chinese: 東京; pinyin: Dōngjīng; Vietnamese: Đông Kinh), the "eastern capital" of Đại Việt. Locally, the area is known as Bắc Kỳ (北圻), the "northern area".

== History ==
=== Predecessors ===
The territory was conquered by the Qin dynasty general Zhao Tuo after the death of Qin Shi Huang. In the chaos surrounding the Chu–Han Contention, he declared its independence as Nanyue and ruled from Panyu (modern Guangzhou). Jiaozhou was the Han dynasty country subdivision formed from the annexation of this tributary kingdom in 111 BCE and it initially comprised the areas of modern Guangdong, Guangxi, and northern Vietnam.

During the Three Kingdoms era, Eastern Wu split from Liangguang as Guangzhou in 222 CE. Tang rule in northern Vietnam began in 622 after Qiu He, the Chinese warlord recognized Tang authority.

=== Tang Protectorate ===
Prior to the Annan Protectorate, the region it encompassed was part of Jiaozhou, a province created during the Han dynasty (202 BC – 220 AD). In 679, the Annan Protectorate replaced the Jiaozhou Protectorate and was seated in Songping County (宋平縣) in present day Hanoi.

The Annan Protectorate was briefly renamed to Zhennan Protectorate in 757 due to the An Lushan rebellion. The Annan Protectorate came under attack from Nanzhao in 846 and the conflict lasted until 866, after which it was renamed Jinghai Army by Gao Pian, the general who defeated the Nanzhao forces.

=== List of notable events ===
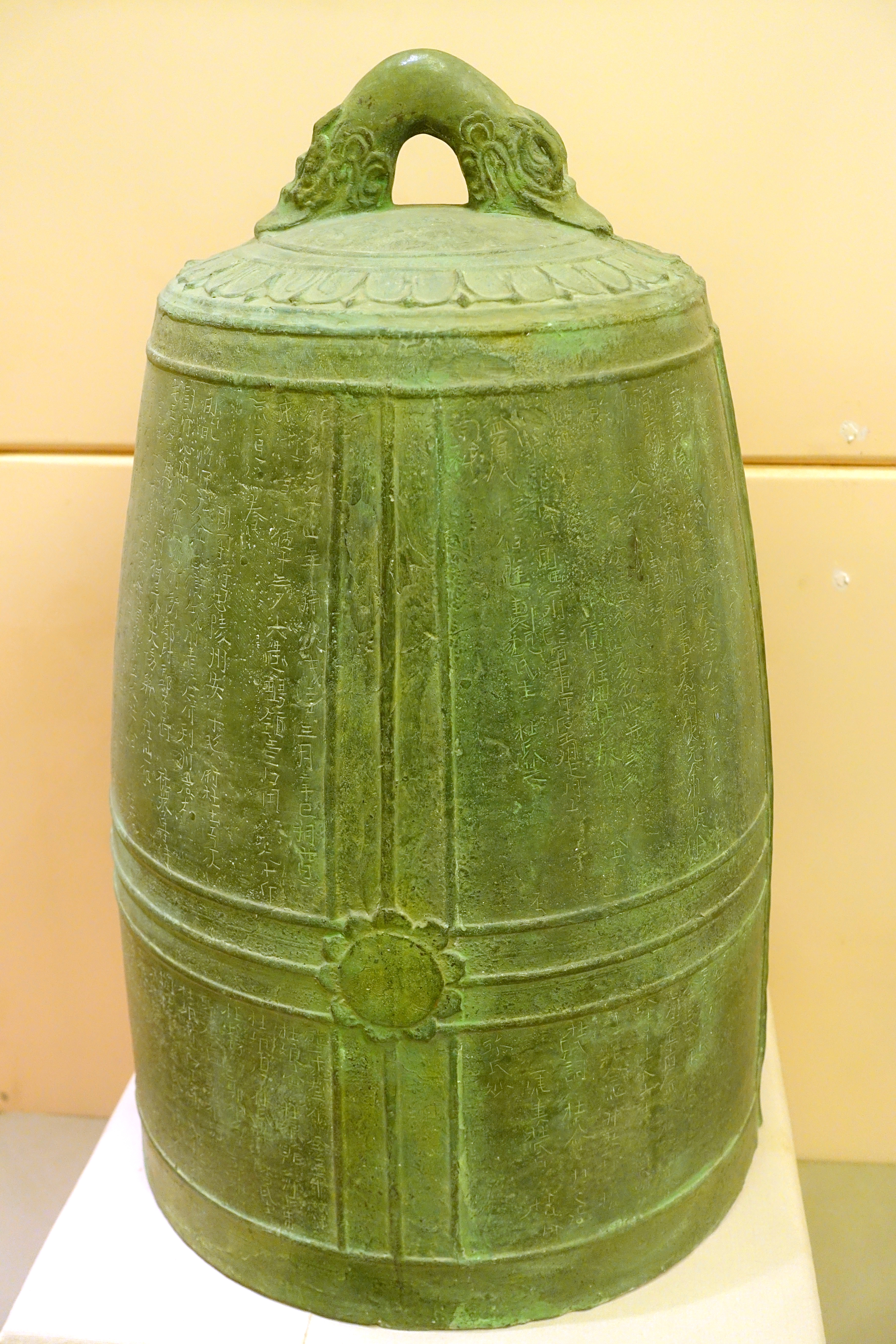
Thanh Mai bell cast in 13th year of Zhēngyuán 貞元 (798), shows names of 243 Vietnamese men and women on its inscription.

In 676, jiedushi and governors of Guangxi, Guangdong and Jiaozhou established a method of selecting local men for administrative positions. Every four years, the "southern selection" would choose aboriginal chiefs to be appointed to fill positions of the fifth degree and above. Taxation was more moderate than within the empire proper; the harvest tax was one-half the standard rate, an acknowledgement of the political problems inherent in ruling a non-Chinese population.

In 687, the new governor of Annan, Liu Yanyou tried to levy full taxes on the Li people, who had been given special tax exemptions requiring them to pay only half the normal tax rate. The indigenous peasants under chief Lý Tự Tiên resisted. Liu Yanyou killed Lý. Đinh Kiến, one of Lý's compatriots, led the people against Yanyou and besieged him in Songping. In the summer, the rebels took Songping and put Yanyou to death. A governor general, Feng Yuanchang, had earlier been called in to help Liu, but Feng hoped to gain influence at Liu's expense and did nothing to help him. Instead Feng established a fortified camp and sent envoys to the rebels telling them to kill their leader and join him. After Liu was killed, Feng abandoned Annan. Another general, Cao Xuanjing, marched into Annan, put down the rebellion, and executed Đinh Kiến.

In 722, Mai Thúc Loan rebelled in what is now Hà Tĩnh Province and proclaimed himself the "Swarthy Emperor" or "Black Emperor" (Hắc Đẽ). His rebellion rallied people from 23 counties with "400,000 followers". Many were peasants who roamed the countryside, plundering food and other items. He also allied with Champa and Chenla, an unknown kingdom named Jinlin (“Gold Neighbor”) and other unnamed kingdoms. A Chinese army of 100,000 from Guangdong under general Yang Zixu, including a "multitude" of mountain tribesmen who had remained loyal to the Tang, marched directly along the coast, following the old road built by Ma Yuan. Yang Zixu attacked Mai Thúc Loan by surprise and suppressed the rebellion in 723. The corpses of the Swarthy Emperor and his followers were piled up to form a huge mound and were left on public display to check further revolts.

In 761, a Japanese named Abe-no Nakamaro was given charge of the protectorate; his Chinese name was Zhao Heng. He had come to China from Japan in 717 at the age of nineteen to study and subsequently spent his life as an official of the empire. In 753 he had attempted to return to Japan, but his ship was struck by a storm and blown far to the south, where it eventually landed in Hoan. He immediately returned to the Tang capital, but gave up hope of returning to his homeland. A few years later he was sent back south as protector general.

— Keith Weller Taylor

In 767, a Javanese raiding fleet invaded Annan, besieging Songping, but were defeated by Tang marquis Zhang Boyi. In 785, chieftains of the Annamese, Đỗ Anh Hàn, Phùng Hưng and Phùng An rebelled, due to Chinese governor Gao Zhengping's doubling of taxes. Tang forces retook Annan in 791.

In 803, a northern state of Champa, Huanwang, seized southern Annan. Tang troops working on garrison fortifications also revolted. From 803 to 863, local rebels killed or expelled no fewer than six protector-generals of Annan. In 820, Dương Thanh (Yang Qing) rebelled, seized Songping, and killed the protectorate general. Dương Thanh was unpopular due to his cruelty and put to death by the locals soon after, however the region continued to experience disorders for the next 16 years.

From 823 to 826, the Nung people (Huang people), aided by raiders from Champa, attacked Yongzhou and seized 18 counties. These raiders, known as the barbarians of the "Nung Grottoes" (Yellow Grotto Barbarians), sought aid from Nanzhao after the Tang retaliated from 827-835. In 845, governor Wu Hun tried to get his troops to rebuild the city walls of Songping but they rebelled and forced him to flee. The rebellion was put down. In 846 "barbarians" from Yunnan (Nanzhao) raided Annan. The new governor Pei Yuanyu counterattacked with soldiers from neighboring provinces.

=== Rebellion, invasion, and renaming ===
In 854, the new Jiedushi of Annan, Li Zhuo, provoked hostility with the mountain tribes by prohibiting the salt trade and killing powerful chieftains, resulting in the defection of prominent local leaders to Nanzhao. The chieftain Lý Do Độc, as well as others, submitted to Nanzhao. In 858, Nanzhao invaded Annan while the new jiedushi, Li Hu, killed the son of a chieftain who was implicated in a mutiny, further alienating powerful clans in Annan and causing them to defect to Nanzhao. While Nanzhao invaded in earnest, the Đỗ clan rebelled with 30,000 men. Then in early 863, Nanzhao and tribal allies took Songping after a bitter siege. There was general chaos as Nanzhao ravaged Annan, alienating the locals, and the balance of power see-sawed between Tang and Nanzhao forces. In 864, the experienced Tang general, Gao Pian, led a counterattack that saw the defeat of Nanzhao forces in 866. He recaptured Songping, the capital of Annan, and named the rebuilt capital Daluo (V. Đại La). He also renamed the region of Annan to Jinghai Jun (lit. Peaceful Sea Army).

=== Aftermath ===
Gao Pian departed from Annan in 868 and left his grandson, Kao Xun, in charge of Annan. In the 870s, Kao Xun was replaced by Zeng Gun, who was Gao Pian's most trusted assistant during the Nanzhao war. The Tang conducted a campaign against local tribes in Annan in 874-879. In 877, troops deployed from Annan in Guangxi mutinied. In 880, the army in Annan mutinied, taking the city of Đại La, and forced the military commissioner Zeng Gun to flee north, ending de facto Chinese control in Northern Vietnam.

== Culture and religion ==
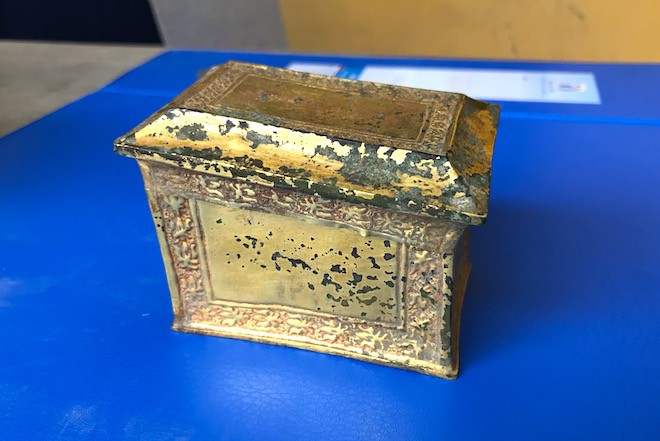
Gold-gilded box contains sacred Śarīra, made in 2nd year of Zhenguan-貞觀 (628), from Nhạn Tháp pagoda, Nghệ An.

During the era of the Annan Protectorate, the indigenous people living within its jurisdiction had no particular name. They were referred to in Chinese writing as the Wild Man (Wild Barbarians), the Li or the Annamese. Since antiquity the peoples of Northern Vietnam had been noted for their common tattooing and cropped hair, wearing line ponchos, wielded wooden spears, and shot boneheaded arrows. They also sacrificed men to their agricultural gods. In the north, around Yongzhou (Nanning), near modern-day Guangxi, mountains were the territories of the Huang (Ghwang) people or the "Grotto Barbarians", the Nùng people and the Ning clans.

Revival of direct Tang control over Annan for two centuries resulted in a hybrid Tang-indigenous culture, political and legal structures. Not only the local sinicized elites used Chinese script, but both the Sino-Vietnamese elite and the ordinary common folks used Chinese style surnames and personal names. However many of the recorded personal names do not make any sense in Chinese, which indicates they may have been taken from another language, such as Vietnamese. A large number of Chinese officers and soldiers were sent to Annan, some of whom married local women and settled down. Buddhism thrived in Annan throughout the Tang era. Some of Chinese monks came and taught Chinese Buddhism in Annan. Wu Yantong (d. 820), a prominent Chinese monk in Annan, brought a new sect of Chan Buddhism that survived for about five centuries. Local women had large roles and status in religious life and society. Vietnamese temples and monasteries differed with Chinese and other East Asian countries in their role as the đình, the village spiritual center, where village elders met. The famous Tang Chinese monk Yijing mentioned six Vietnamese monks who went on pilgrimage to India and Ceylon in search of the Dharma. Although Daoism became the dynasty's official religion, four prominent Tang poets praised Buddhist masters who hailed from Annan. Indigenous Confucianist scholarly elites remained relatively small. In 845, a Tang official reported to the throne that "Annan has produced no more than eight imperial officials; senior graduates have not exceeded ten." Liêu Hữu Phương was the only recorded student from Annan to have passed the classical exams in 816 in the Tang capital of Chang'an. He succeeded on his second attempt and became a librarian at the imperial court.

Formerly the Buddha was born in Tianzhu [India],
Now he manifests himself here to convert the people of Rinan.
Free from all defilements,
He built a temple at the foot of the mountain.
By the stream the fragrant branches are the standards,
The boulders on the mountaintop become his home.
Blue doves practice meditation,
White monkeys listen to the sutras.
Creepers cover the cloud-high cliffs,
Flowers rise above the pond at the foot of the mountain.
The water in the streams is good for performing ritual,
The trees let him hang his clothes on them.
This disciple regrets that he is ignorant,
Not able to discuss the Buddha's doctrine.
Who one night crossed over the Tiger-stream,
Amidst mountain fog under a lonely tree.

— Shen Quanqi reflecting on the establishment of Buddhism in Rinan

== List of governors ==
Protectorate governors (都護) are civilian governors of the Protectorate. Military administration is held by Jiedushi (Military commissioner). During rebellion and wartime, the two position can be held by the same person.

- Liu Yanyou 劉延祐 681–687
- Yang Min 楊敏 (During Wu Zetian's reign)
- Cui Xuanxin 崔玄信 (During Wu Zetian's reign)
- Guang Chuke 光楚客
- Xin Ziyan 辛子言
- He Lüguang 何履光 749–751
- Wang Zhijin 王知進
- Kang Qian 康謙
- Dou Meng 竇蒙
- Chao Heng 晁衡 (aka Abe no Nakamaro) 761–767
- Zhang Boyi 張伯儀 767–777
- Wu Chongfu 烏崇福 777–782
- Li Mengqiu 李孟秋 782
- Fu Liangjiao 輔良交 782–785
- Zhang Ying 張應 788
- Pang Fu 龐復 789
- Gao Zhengping 高正平 790–791
- Zhao Chang 趙昌 791–802
- Pei Tai 裴泰 802–803
- Zhao Chang 804–806
- Zhang Zhou 張舟 806–810
- Ma Zong 馬總 810–813
- Zhang Mian 張勔 813
- Pei Xingli 裴行立 813–817
- Li Xianggu 李象古 817–819 - killed by Yang Qing, who rebelled and killed by Gui Zhongwu
- Gui Zhongwu 桂仲武 819–820
- Pei Xingli 820
- Gui Zhongwu 820–822
- Wang Chengbian 王承弁 822
- Li Yuanxi 李元喜 822–826
- Han Yue 韓約 827–828
- Zheng Chuo 鄭綽 831
- Liu Min 劉旻 833
- Han Wei 韓威 834
- Tian Zao 田早 835
- Ma Zhi 馬植 836–840
- Wu Hun 武渾 843
- Pei Yuanyu 裴元裕 846–847
- Tian Zaiyou 田在宥 849–850
- Cui Geng 崔耿 852
- Li Zhuo 李琢 853–855
- Song Ya 宋涯 857
- Li Hongfu 李弘甫 857–858
- Wang Shi 王式 858–860 (military Jinglueshi)
- Li Hu 李鄠 860–861
- Wang Kuan 王寬 861–862
- Cai Xi 蔡襲 862–863 (military Jinglueshi)
- Song Rong 宋戎 863 (Governor of Jiaozhou, based in Haimen in present-day Guangxi as Annan was invaded by Nanzhao)
- Zhang Yin 張茵 864 (Jinglueshi, Annan invaded by Nanzhao)
- Gao Pian 864 (Jinglueshi, later became jiedushi of Jinghai from 866 to 868)

== Administrative divisions ==
- Jiaozhou (交州)
- Aizhou (愛州)
- Huanzhou (驩州)
- Fengzhou (峰州)
- Luzhou (陸州)
- Shanzhou (山州)
- Yanzhou (演州)
- Changzhou (長州)
- Junzhou (郡州)
- Liangzhou (諒州)
- Wu'anzhou (武安州)
- Fuluzhou (福祿州)
- Wu'ezhou (武峨州)
- Gongzhou (貢州)
- Wudingzhou (武定州)
- Tangzhou (湯州)
- Sumaozhou (蘇茂州)

== Population ==
Period	Year	Households	Population	Sources
Kāiyuán	740-742	75,839	299,377	

== See also ==
- Protectorate General to Pacify the East (Andong)
- Protectorate General to Pacify the West (Anxi)
- Southward expansion of the Han dynasty
- History of Vietnam
- Administrative divisions of the Tang dynasty

== Bibliography ==
- Churchman, Michael (2010), "Before Chinese and Vietnamese in the Red River Plain", Chinese Southern Diaspora Studies, 4
- Dutton, George E. (2012), Sources of Vietnamese Tradition, Columbia University Press
- Herman, John E. (2007), Amid the Clouds and Mist China's Colonization of Guizhou, 1200–1700, Harvard University Asia Center, ISBN 978-0-674-02591-2
- Kiernan, Ben (2019). Việt Nam: a history from earliest time to the present. Oxford University Press. ISBN 9780190053796.
- Maspero, Henri (1912). "Études sur la phonétique historique de la langue annamite" [Studies on the phonetic history of the Annamite language]. Bulletin de l'École française d'Extrême-Orient (in French). 12 (1). doi:10.3406/befeo.1912.2713.
- Schafer, Edward Hetzel (1967), The Vermilion Bird: T'ang Images of the South, Los Angeles: University of California Press, ISBN 9780520011458
- Shing, Müller (2004), Archäologie und Frühe Texte, Harrassowitz, ISBN 9783447050609
- Taylor, Keith Weller (1983), The Birth of the Vietnam, University of California Press, ISBN 9780520074170
- Taylor, K.W. (2013), A History of the Vietnamese, Cambridge University Press, ISBN 9780520074170
- Thich, Quang Minh (2007), Vietnamese Buddhism in America, United States of America: The Florida State University
- Walker, Hugh Dyson (2012), East Asia: A New History, ISBN 978-1477265161
- Wang, Zhenping (2013). Tang China in Multi-Polar Asia: A History of Diplomacy and War. University of Hawaii Press.
- Xiong, Victor Cunrui (2009), Historical Dictionary of Medieval China, United States of America: Scarecrow Press, Inc., ISBN 978-0810860537
