= Phùng Hưng =

Vietnamese rebel leader against Tang China

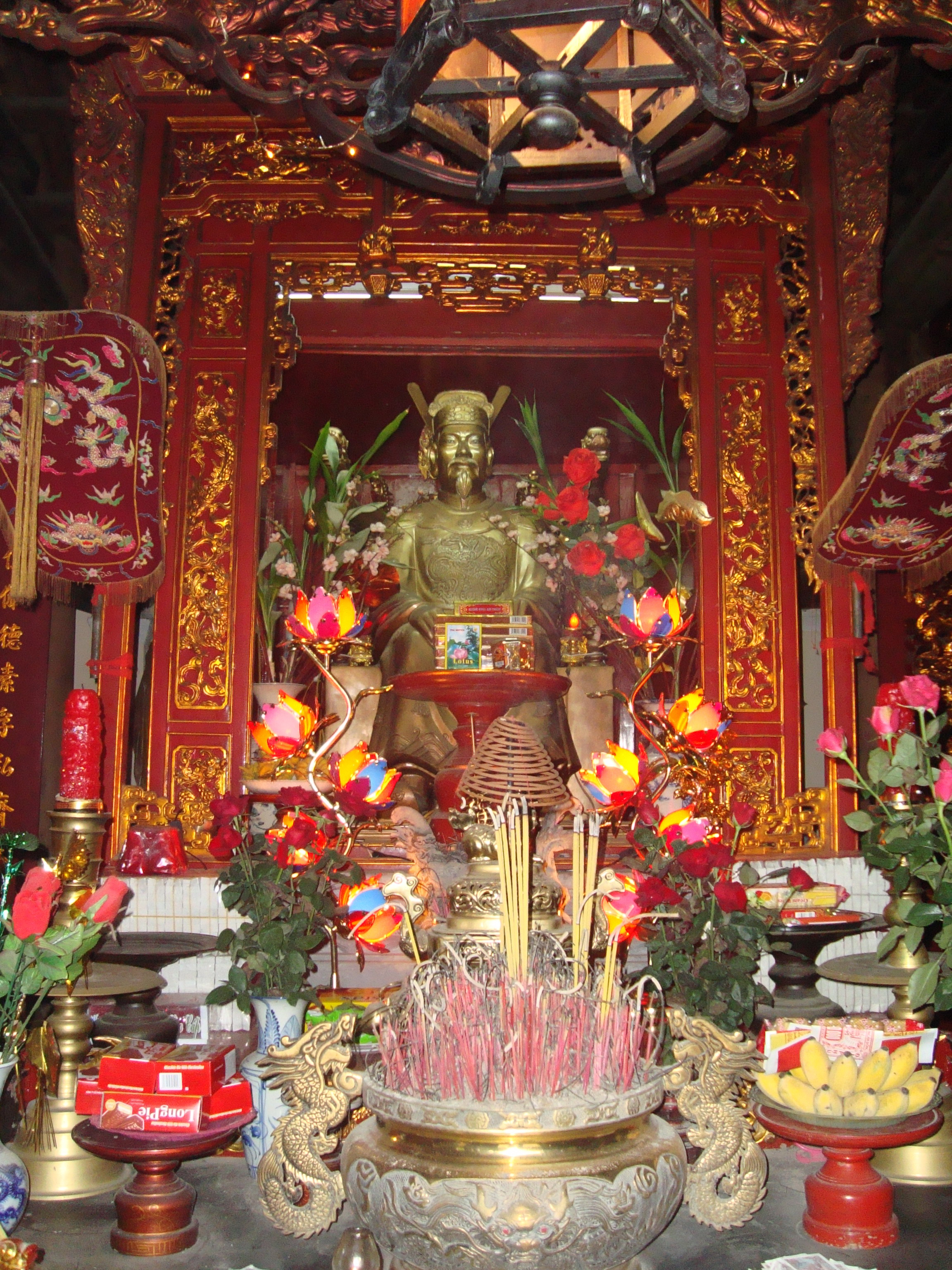

Vietnamese name
- Vietnamese: Phùng Hưng
- Hán-Nôm: 馮興

Phùng Hưng (馮興, ? – 789/791) was a Vietnamese chief and military leader who briefly reigned over Annam (present-day Vietnam) during the 8th century.

According to Đại Việt sử ký toàn thư (fascicle 6), Phùng Hưng, a native of Đường Lâm (in today's Hà Tây Province), was rich and possessed prodigious physical strength. In 791, Phùng Hưng and his brother, Phùng Hải, led a rebellion against the ruling Chinese Tang dynasty. Taking the advice of Đỗ Anh Hàn, the Phùng brothers laid siege to the headquarters of the Annam Protectorate, which was managed by the corrupt officer, Cao Chính Bình (高正平). Facing the crisis, Cao Chính Bình caught an illness and died shortly after. Phùng Hưng then became ruler of Annam. He ruled for 11 years and was succeeded by his son Phùng An. Phùng An bestowed upon Phùng Hưng an honorific title Bố Cái Đại Vương. Phùng An surrendered to the Chinese governor in early 803.

Phùng Hưng is not mentioned in Tang works of history. In Tang Shu (fascicle 13) and Xin Tang Shu (fascicle 7), the rebellion is said to have been led by Đỗ Anh Hàn.

Phùng Hưng was known among the Vietnamese people as "Bố Cái Đại Vương" and was worshipped by fifteen communes. This level of reverence was even greater than that accorded to Vietnamese emperors throughout history.

As to his posthumous title, which means “Great King” in Chinese, Phùng Hưng's title represented two Viet Han words. The title Bố Cái is equivalent to “Father and Mother” (i.e. as respectable as one's parents), but they may also represent Vua Cái, “Great King” (i.e. the meaning is expressed in two different languages).
