= Songping =

Songping (Chinese: 宋平; pinyin: Sòngpíng; Wade–Giles: Sung-p‘ing), or Tống Bình in Vietnamese, was a former imperial Chinese and Vietnamese settlement on the south bank of the Red River within the present-day Từ Liêm and Hoài Đức districts of Hanoi, Vietnam.

== History ==
A fortified settlement was founded by the Chinese Liu Song dynasty as the seat of Songping County (t 宋平縣, s 宋平县, p Sòngpíng Xiàn) within Jiaozhi (Giao Chỉ) commandery. The name refers to its pacification by the dynasty. It was elevated to its own commandery (宋平郡, p Sòngpíng Jùn; Vietnamese: Tống Bình quận) at some point between AD 454 and 464. The commandery included the districts of Yihuai (t 義懷, s 义怀, p Yìhuái) and Suining (t 綏寧, s 绥宁, p Suíníng).

The Sui general Liu Fang reconquered the territory from the Vietnamese state of Van Xuan in 603 and made Tống Bình the capital of Jiaozhi in place of Long Biên. During this period, it was also known as Luocheng (t 羅城, s 罗城, p Luóchéng, w Lo-ch'eng, lit. "Enveloping Wall"; Vietnamese: La Thành), although this name originally referred to nearby Long Biên and later referred to the fortification which grew into Thăng Long and modern Hanoi.

Under the Tang, the city continued to function as the capital of Annam. For a few years after 621, the city administered a prefecture as Songzhou (宋州, p Sòngzhōu, w Sung-chou). The name Tống Bình was ended in 714. The rebellion of Mai Thúc Loan captured the city in 722.

== See also ==
- Hanoi, the modern city
- History of Hanoi
- Long Biên, the nearby settlement and former capital
- Đại La
