= Wang Shi (Tang dynasty) =

Wang Shi (王式) was an official and general of the Chinese Tang dynasty, known for his campaign against Nanzhao forces to retain the control of the Annan (i.e., modern northern Vietnam) region, and his campaign against the agrarian rebel Qiu Fu (裘甫).

== Background and early career ==
It is not known when Wang Shi was born. His biographies in the official histories of the Tang dynasty—the Old Book of Tang and the New Book of Tang—differ as to who his father was, with the Old Book of Tang indicating that his father was the chancellor Wang Bo and the New Book of Tang indicating that his father was Wang Bo's brother Wang Qi (王起), who also had a lengthy career as an imperial official.

Because of his heritage, Wang Shi was made a scribe for the crown prince, and he later passed, in 828, during the reign of Emperor Wenzong, a special imperial examination for those who are considered wise and righteous. He was later made an imperial censor with the title Dianzhong Shiyushi (殿中侍御史). He was considered frugal in his youth. However, in the middle of Emperor Wenzong's Taihe era (827–835), Wang, who was considered ambitious, tried to achieve greater offices by associating with the powerful eunuch Wang Shoucheng and Wang Shoucheng's associate Zheng Zhu, and when the deputy chief imperial censor Gui Rong (歸融) submitted an accusation against him on that basis, he was sent out of the capital Chang'an to serve as the deputy mayor of Jiangling.

During the Dazong era (847–860) of Emperor Wenzong's uncle Emperor Xuānzong, Wang Shi served as the prefect of Jin Prefecture (晉州, in modern Linfen, Shanxi). At that time, there was a major famine in the Yellow River bend area (i.e., modern northern Shaanxi and central-western Inner Mongolia), and the refugees spread throughout the region. Few prefectures welcomed the refugees, but Wang did, and it was said that several thousands were saved because of his actions. The non-Han tribes of the region also suffered from the famine and were pillaging the cities, but after hearing that Wang was defending Jin Prefecture carefully, avoided attacking Jin Prefecture.

== Campaign for control of Annan ==
Some time prior to 858, however, Wang Shi was no longer in an active position—rather, he was nominally the teacher for Emperor Xuānzong's son Li Men (李汶), but was holding his office at the eastern capital Luoyang. In 858, he was made the commandant and commander of the military of Annan District (安南, headquartered in modern Hanoi, Vietnam). At that time, Annan had been under repeated Nanzhao attacks because the abusive rule of a prior commandant, Li Zhuo (李涿), had led the natives of the region to encourage Nanzhao incursions. After Wang's arrival in Annan, he built wooden defenses for the city, such that he was able to fend off Nanzhao incursions.

Wang also had to deal with his own mutinous subordinates. One of the officers, Luo Xinggong (羅行恭), had amassed 2,000 elite soldiers under his own command, while the commandant's own troops were far weaker and only numbered about 600. Luo thus was resistant to the commandants' orders. After Wang's arrival, Wang had Luo caned and exiled. Later in the year, a group of soldiers, who were fearful that they would be attacked by Tang troops from Rong District (容管, headquartered in modern Yulin, Guangxi), had Wang's headquarters surrounded, demanding that he leave and return to the north, so that they could use the city to defend against a Rong District attack. Wang refused and rebuked them, and they fled. He later arrested and executed them. Wang further used various tricks to cause a dissension among the locally prominent Du family, which had long resisted the rule of the commandants of Annan, causing the leader of the Dus, Du Shoucheng (杜守澄), to flee and die in flight. It was said that for six straight years prior to Wang's arrival, Annan had not paid tributes or taxes to the imperial government, nor had any rewards been given to soldiers, and that it was Wang who resumed these things after pacifying the region. Further, as a result, the neighboring kingdoms of Champa and Chenla resumed their tributary relationships with Tang.

== Campaign against Qiu Fu ==
As of 860, during the reign of Emperor Xuānzong's son Emperor Yizong, Wang Shi was no longer the commandant of Annan. By that point, an agrarian rebellion led by Qiu Fu had overrun Zhedong Circuit (浙東, headquartered in modern Shaoxing, Zhejiang), and the governor (觀察使, Guanchashi) of Zhedong, Zheng Zhide (鄭祇德), was unable to put down the rebellion. Under the recommendation of the chancellor Xiahou Zi, Emperor Yizong made Wang the governor of Zhedong to succeed Zheng. When meeting with Emperor Yizong, Wang requested a large number of troops—and a eunuch accompanying the emperor opposed on the basis of the high expense. Wang, however, justified his request by pointing out that the Yangtze River-Huai River region was the main tax base for the empire, and that a failure in suppressing Qiu's rebellion would cost the imperial government far more than the expenses of a successful campaign. Emperor Yizong agreed and mobilized troops from Zhongwu (忠武, headquartered in modern Xuchang, Henan), Yicheng (義成, headquartered in modern Anyang, Henan), and Huainan (淮南, headquartered in modern Yangzhou, Jiangsu) Circuits to serve under Wang.

Once Wang arrived at Zhedong, he supplemented his troops by recruiting ethnic Uyghur and Tibetan exiles who had been settled in the region to join his army, to improve the mobility of his troops as the Uyghurs and Tibetans were capable riders. He divided his troops into two groups and attacked Qiu in two prongs. In doing so, he used some tactics that surprised the experienced officers of his army:

- Despite the needs of the army, he ordered that all of the counties in the region still under government control to open their food storages and distribute food to the people. (He later justified this as pointing out that Qiu's followers had been motivated by hunger, as the region had suffered from a famine, and that distributing the food would prevent more people from joining Qiu—and further, as the counties were largely defenseless, if Qiu attacked, the food would fall into Qiu's hands.)
- He established no fire beacon posts for communication between the troops. (He later justified this by pointing out that the purpose of the beacon posts was to sound an alarm and seek reinforcements. As he was using all of his troops in attacking Qiu, there would be no reinforcements available, and the fires would merely serve to alarm the populace.)
- He sent the most cowardly soldiers to serve as forward scouts. (He later justified this by pointing out that if he had sent the most brave soldiers, those soldiers might prematurely engage the enemy, and therefore, if they were then killed in the engagements, he would receive no intelligence information.)

After Wang's army defeated Qiu's in several battles, Qiu fled to Shan (剡, in modern Shaoxing). Wang put Shan under siege, and Qiu subsequently surrendered. Wang executed some 20 commandes under Qiu, and delivered Qiu to Chang'an, where Qiu was executed.

== Suppression of Wuning soldiers ==
In 862, the elite Yindao (銀刀, "silver sword") soldiers at Wuning Circuit (武寧, headquartered in modern Xuzhou, Jiangsu) mutinied and expelled the military governor (jiedush) Wen Zhang (溫璋). Emperor Yizong made Wang Shi the military governor of Wuning and ordered that he take the Zhongwu and Yicheng troops that had served under him during the campaign against Qiu, who were still at Zhedong at the time, to Wuning with him. The Yindao soldiers, hearing this, became fearful. Three days after Wang's arrival, he announced that a grand feast would be held for the Zhongwu and Yicheng troops to send them off. The Yindao soldiers also attended the feast. During the feast, he had the Zhongwu and Yicheng soldiers surround them and slaughter them, killing several thousands. Subsequently, Emperor Yizong ordered that Wuning Circuit be disbanded, with its territory divided between Huainan, Yanhai (兗海, headquartered in modern Jining, Shandong) Circuits, and a newly created Susi (宿泗, headquartered in modern Suzhou, Anhui) Circuit. Wang was put in charge of the operation to distribute the Wuning soldiers to those circuits. After the task was complete, he was recalled to Chang'an to serve as a general of the imperial guards, a post that he served at until death. It is not known when he died.

== Notes and references ==
- Old Book of Tang, vol. 164.
- New Book of Tang, vol. 167.
- Zizhi Tongjian, vols. 243, 249, 250.
