= Zeng Gun =

Tang era officer

Zeng Gun (曾袞; Wade–Giles: Tseng Kun) was an officer of Chinese Tang dynasty, he served as the governor of the Jinghai polity in northern Vietnam from 878 to 880. Zeng Gun also had served Gao Pian during the Nanzhao war. During the years he lived in northern Vietnam, he had interests in local culture and spent years in collecting local folklore. His works include the story Mountain spirit and the Spirit of Cao Lỗ. Contributions of Zeng Gun and Zhao Chang (fl. 791–802) later were cited by 14th century Vietnamese author Lý Tế Xuyên in Việt Điện U Linh Tập (1329).

== Bibliography ==
- Dutton, George; Werner, Jayne; Whitmore, John K., eds. (2012). Sources of Vietnamese Tradition. Columbia University Press. ISBN 978-0-231-51110-0.
- Taylor, Keith Weller (1983), The Birth of the Vietnam, University of California Press, ISBN 9780520074170
