= Đại La =

Đại La (Chinese: 大羅城; pinyin: Dàluóchéng), means the Citadel of the Great Dike, or La Thành (羅城) was an ancient fortified city in present-day Hanoi during the third Chinese domination of the 7th and 8th centuries, and again in the 11th-century under Lý dynasty.

Đại La was constructed by jiedushi Gao Pian in 866. It was the seat of Songping County during the Tang dynasty, and was capital of the Tĩnh Hải quân. In 1010, Lý Công Uẩn decided to move his capital away from the cramped Hoa Lư (present-day Ninh Bình). Đại La was favored because of its central and convenient location, defensible terrain and relatively dry climate. According to the Đại Việt sử ký toàn thư, a Yellow Dragon appeared near Lý Công Uẩn's boat when he passed by Đại La. The sighting was considered as greatly auspicious by his ministers. Subsequently, the city was renamed Thăng Long ("rising dragon").

== Archaeology ==
Dai La's wall had a perimeter of 6,334 meters and was about 7.5 meters high. The city had enclosed guard posts, courtyards, some thousand buildings, a water sewerage system, and a 4.5-meter high dike. Excavations from 2002 to 2009 in an area covered 19,000 square meters recovered large quantities of artifacts, probably dated through the period of occupation, i.e. 7th–10th century. Various tiles masoned with human faces, lotus motif, and flat tiles with human and animal faces were found. Local produced ceramics, Chinese ceramics and West Asian ceramics were also being recovered from the site.

== See also ==
- Long Biên

== Sources ==
- Purton, Peter Fraser (2009). A History of the Late Medieval Siege, 450-1220. Boydell & Brewer.
- Miksic, John Norman; Yian, Go Geok (2016). Ancient Southeast Asia. Taylor & Francis.

21°01′42″N 105°51′15″E
