= Administration of territory in dynastic China =

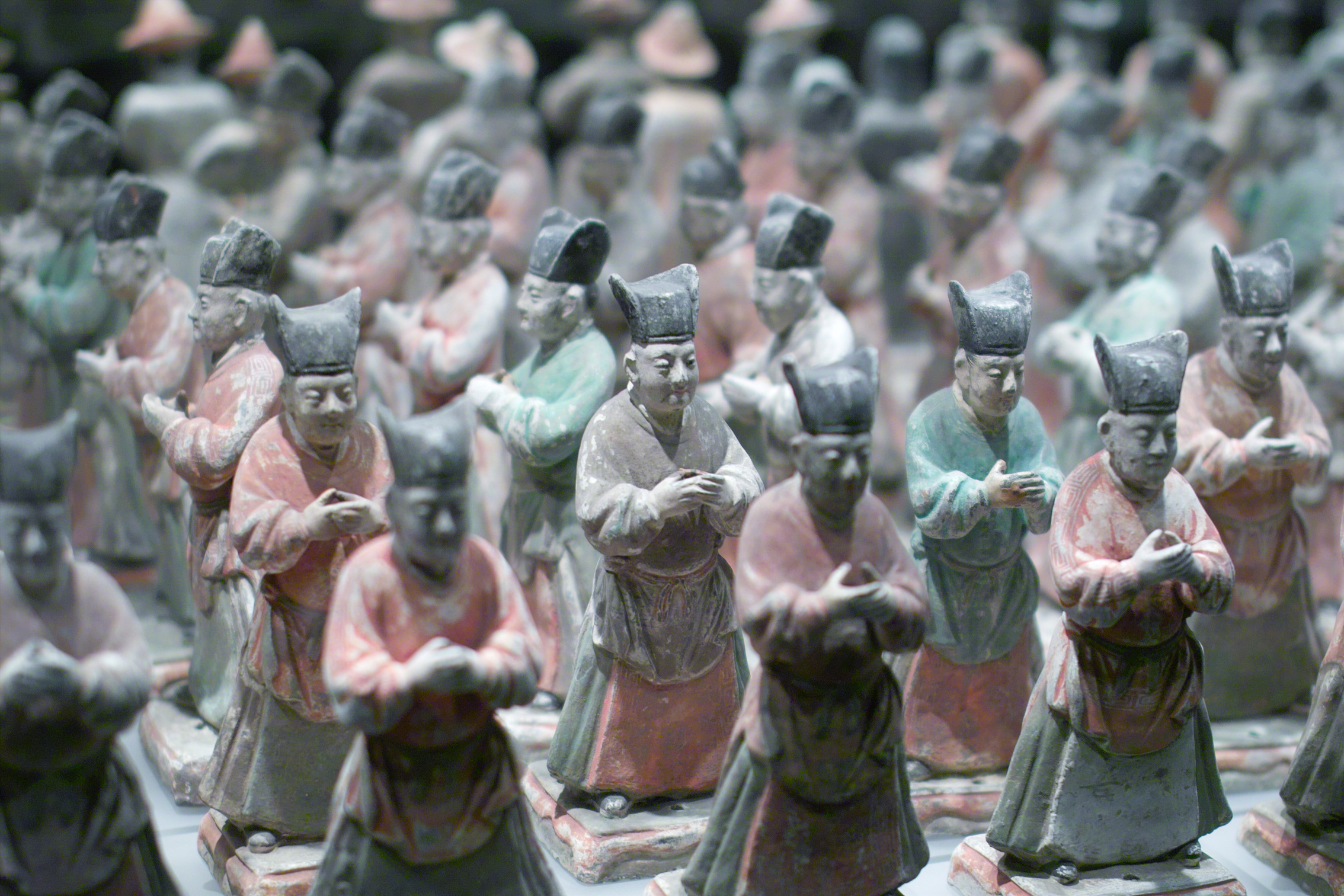
Funerary figurines of Tang dynasty officials

The administration of territory in dynastic China is the history of practices involved in governing the land from the Qin dynasty (221–206 BC) to the Qing dynasty (1644–1912).

== Administrative divisions in imperial China ==
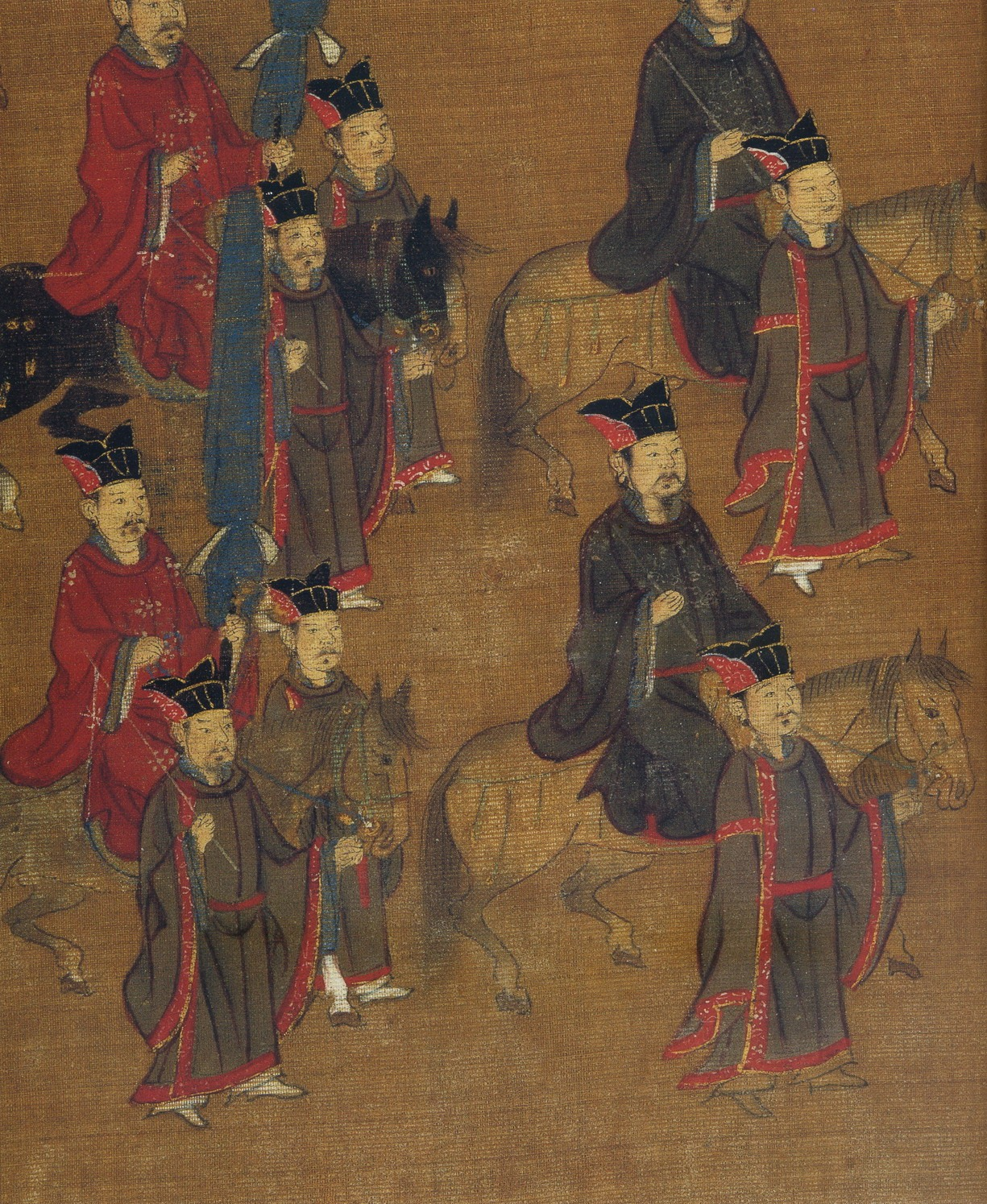
Song dynasty officials

=== County ===
The only level at which state officials actually governed the common people was the county level. Counties were coordinated by prefectures which had on average, about ten counties. Overseeing inspectors were sent out from the central government to oversee the work of the prefectures. During the Yuan (1271–1368) and Ming (1368–1644) dynasties, these arrangements were solidified into permanent provinces. Funding for the local administration came from taxes collected while a portion was set aside for the central government.

Counties (xian 縣) originally meant "dependencies" ruled by vassals of royal blood. During the Qin dynasty (221–206 BC), they were coordinated by commanderies (jun 郡) and expanded throughout the entire empire, but the Han (202 BC–220 AD) returned them to indirect rule by vassals. However, after 100 years, the dependencies were gradually converted into counties or incorporated by 100 BC. In practice, most dynasties started out with some combination of the county and dependency dichotomy and trended towards greater centralization through the county/prefectural system over time.

The county was headed by a "court-appointed official" (chaoting mingguan 朝廷命官) responsible for collecting taxes, hearing trials, public order, education, examinations, morality, and religious customs. Counties in politically important areas were assigned to jinshi degree holders while counties in remote areas were assigned to provincial exam graduates (juren). During the Ming dynasty, the percentage of jinshi degree holding magistrates could range from 71% to 5% depending on their assigned area's importance. In theory, each local magistrate's office (yamen) was divided into six sections corresponding to the Six Ministries. By Qing times, additional sections were also added for taxes, document receipt and distribution, and salt. On average, each Qing county had 20-30 clerks working these sections. They were selected by the magistrate and received a government stipend. Working under the clerks were a variety of subofficials and support personnel. The yamen also had runners (yanyi) doing menial work. In the late 19th century the total number of people employed by the yamen in a county could range from 200 to over 500.

==== Village ====
Below the county were villages and city wards governed by a combination of magistrates, city governments, local families, and local militia. During Qin and Han times, counties were separated into five rural villages or townships (xiang 鄉). Below rural districts were villages (li 里) that contained squads (wu 伍). Security in these rural districts were handled by a district leader (tingzhang 亭長) (ex. Emperor Gaozu of Han). Later dynasties had security institutions composed of several households such as the baojia system.

=== Provincial administration ===
Regional governments were introduced by the Qin dynasty after it destroyed the last independent hereditary kingdoms. The Qin empire was divided into commanderies (jun), each of which was led by three officials. The Han dynasty identified the rapid concentration of central power as one of the reasons for the Qin downfall and therefore only adopted the commandery/prefectural system for half its territory and installed hereditary kingdoms in the other half. They were gradually brought under Han control and as a result, there were 103 commanderies by the end of Eastern Han (25–220). Thirteen regional inspectorates (cishi 刺史) were established over them. Most of them were named after the Nine Regions and were thus called zhou (province). These provinces, circuits, or inspectorates did not function as provincial governorships. Both the Tang and Song saw these regions as broad areas for Commissioners to coordinate government activity. Each circuit (dao or lu) was assigned four Commissions, each tasked with a different administrative activity: military, fiscal, judicial, and supply.

Permanent provincial administrations developed under the Yuan and Ming dynasties. The Yuan province, called a Branch Secretariat (xing zhongshu sheng 行中書省), was governed by two Managers of Governmental Affairs (pingzhang zhengshi 平章政事). Sometimes a Grand Chancellor (chengxiang 丞相) was in charge of an entire province. It's uncertain how much central authority the government had over these provinces since they were essentially ruled by Mongol nobles. Between the provinces and the central government were two agencies: the Branch Bureau of Military Affairs (xing shumi yuan 行樞密院) and the Branch Censorate (xing yushi tai 行御史臺). The Ming provincial government consisted of three cooperating agencies: the Provincial Administration Commission (chengxuan buzheng shisi 承宣布政使司), the Provincial Surveillance Commission (tixing ancha shisi 提刑按察使司), and the Regional Military Commission (du zhihui shisi 都指揮使). They were directed by a Grand Coordinator, whose tenure was indefinite, and a Supreme Commander. Executive officials of the Three Provincial Commissions were called Regional Overseers. The Qing dynasty expanded the number of provinces to 18 by 1850 and did away with the tripartite provincial administration. Qing provinces were governed by a single Governor (xunfu 巡撫) who answered to a Governors-general (zongdu 總督).

=== Metropolitan ===
The metropolitan area, the capital and its hinterlands, was directly subordinate to the central court and often named as such. During the Yuan dynasty, Khanbaliq and its surroundings were named fuli 腹里 (lit. abdomen). The Ming court called Nanjing Yingtian fu 應天府 (lit. responsive to heaven prefecture) and the surrounding area Zhili 直隶 (lit. directly attached) from 1378 to 1403. After 1403, Beiping and its surrounding region was called Bei zhili (northern zhili), and when it became the capital in 1423, Nanjing's metropolitan area was called Nan zhili (southern zhili). Shuntian and Yingtian prefectures were referred to as Jingfu (capital prefectures). During the Qing dynasty, the Shuntian prefect was allowed to directly memorialize the emperor, but the subprefectures and counties were jointly governed with the governor of Zhili. The capital usually had a higher concentration of military personnel. The Qing settled them just outside Beijing with their own farmland and the parks to the north were also strewn with Banner villages.

=== Table of administrative divisions ===
Historical Administrative Divisions in China
Dynasty	Primary	Secondary	Tertiary	Quaternary
Qin	Commandery (郡, jùn)	County (縣/县, xiàn)		
Han, Jin	Province (州, zhōu)	Commandery	County	
Sui	"Prefecture" (many smaller 州)	County		
Tang, Liao	Circuit (道, dào)	Prefecture (smaller: 州; larger: 府, fǔ)	County	
Song and Jin	Circuit (路, lù)	Prefecture (smaller: 州; larger: 府; military: 軍/军, jūn); industrial: 監/监, jiān	County	
Yuan	Province (省, shěng)	Circuit (道, dào)	Prefecture (larger: 府, fǔ; smaller: 州, zhōu)	County
Ming	Directly administered province Zhílì (直隸/直隶); Province (省)	Prefecture (府, Fǔ)	Department (州)	County
Qing	Directly administered province (直隸/直隶); Province (省)	Prefecture (府, Fǔ); Independent department (直隸州/直隶州); Independent subprefecture (直隸廳/直隶厅)	County (縣/县); Department (州); Subprefecture (廳/厅, Tīng)	

== Qin dynasty (221–206 BC) ==
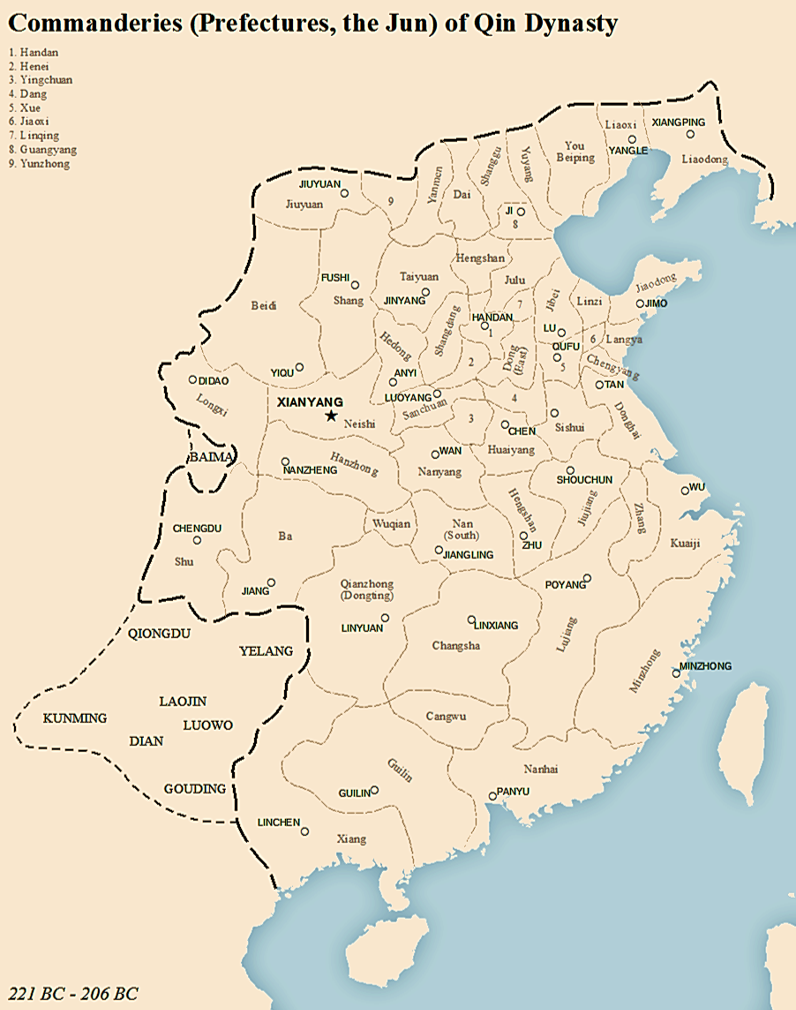
Borders of the commanderies of the Qin Empire.

After the state of Qin conquered China in 221 BC, the "First Emperor of Qin", Qin Shi Huang, divided the Qin dynasty into 36, and then ultimately, 40 commanderies, which were divided into counties, which were further divided into townships (xiang 鄉). The imperial capital was excluded from the normal administrative units and was administered by a Chamberlain (neishi 内侍). Administrative control of a commandery was divided between a Governor (shou 守), who handled general administration, and a Defender (wei 尉), who supervised military garrisons. Counties were administered by a Magistrate (ling 令). Control of a township was divided between an Elder (sanlao 三老), the moral authority, a Husbander (sefu 嗇夫), who handled fiscal affairs, and a Patroller (youjiao 游徼), who kept the local peace. Below townships were even smaller divisions of a thousand households, which constituted a neighborhood (ting 亭), and a hundred households, which constituted a village (li 里).

There was no formal system of recruitment for personnel during Qin times. All appointments down to the county level were based on recommendation and decided by the Grand Chancellor and emperor. Tenures were indefinite. Officials could obtain titles graded from 20 to 1 for meritorious service, but such titles were not hereditary, and did not confer a fief to the holder.

Commanderies of the Qin Empire
Commandery	Chinese Name		Counties & Circuits
Commandery	Trad.	Simp.	Counties & Circuits
Neishi	內史		41
Longxi	隴西郡	陇西郡	21
Shang	上郡		21
Beidi	北地郡		15
Yunzhong	雲中郡	云中郡	12
Jiuyuan	九原郡		8
Sanchuan	三川郡		22
Yingchuan	潁川郡	颍川郡	23
Dang	碭郡	砀郡	22
Dong	東郡	东郡	26
Xue	薛郡		22
Donghai	東海郡	东海郡	18
Sichuan	四川郡		25
Huaiyang	淮陽郡	淮阳郡	27
Nanyang	南陽郡	南阳郡	27
Linzi	臨淄郡	临淄郡	10
Jibei	濟北郡	济北郡	9
Taishan	泰山郡		9
Langxie	琅邪郡		6
Jiaodong	膠東郡	胶东郡	8
Jiaoxi	膠西郡	胶西郡	8
Chengyang	城陽郡	城阳郡	5
Hedong	河東郡	河东郡	19
Henei	河內郡		19
Shangdang	上黨郡	上党郡	21
Taiyuan	太原郡		13
Dai	代郡		11
Yanmen	雁門郡 鴈門郡	雁门郡	17
Handan	邯鄲郡	邯郸郡	11
Julu	鉅鹿郡	巨鹿郡	10
Hengshan	恆山郡	恒山郡	22
Qinghe	清河郡		4
Hejian	河間郡	河间郡	10
Guangyang	廣陽郡	广阳郡	9
Youbeiping	右北平郡		16
Shanggu	上谷郡		12
Yuyang	漁陽郡	渔阳郡	12
Liaoxi	遼西郡	辽西郡	7
Liaodong	遼東郡	辽东郡	3
Hanzhong	漢中郡	汉中郡	12
Shu	蜀郡		18
Ba	巴郡		11
Nan	南郡		20
Jiujiang	九江郡		13
Lujiang	廬江郡	庐江郡	5
Hengshan	衡山郡		5
Kuaiji	會稽郡	会稽郡	27
Changsha	長沙郡	长沙郡	6
Dongting	洞庭郡		11
Cangwu	蒼梧郡	苍梧郡	13
Xiang	象郡		2
Nanhai	南海郡		5
Guilin	桂林郡		5
Minzhong	閩中郡	闽中郡	1

== Han dynasty (202 BC–220 AD) ==
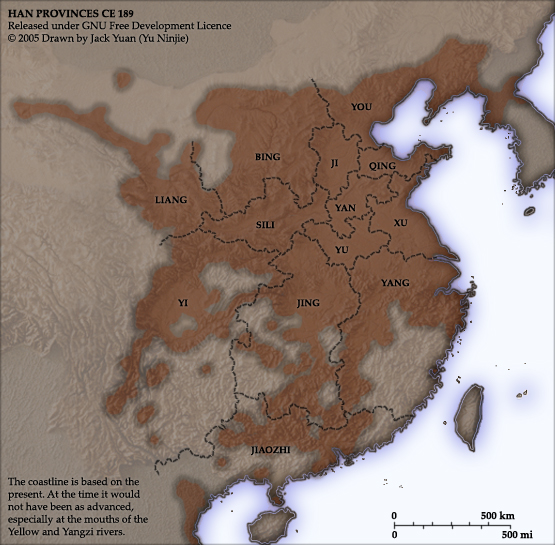
Han provinces, c. 190

The founder of the Han dynasty, Emperor Gaozu of Han (r. 28 February 202 – 1 June 195 BC), separated the dynasty's territory between the western half directly controlled by the imperial capital, and the eastern half, ruled by Kings of the Han dynasty. In the areas controlled by the central government, regional hierarchy followed the Qin model of commandery and county. The eastern nobility ruled kingdoms (wangguo 王國) or marquisates (houguo 侯國) that were largely autonomous until 154 BC when a series of imperial actions gradually brought them under central control. By the end of the millennium they differed from commanderies and counties only in name and were controlled by a Counselor-delegate (guoxiang 國相) appointed by the central government.

Until 106 BC, the central government supervised the commanderies through touring Censors, but in that year, Emperor Wu of Han formally divided the commanderies into 13 provinces. These provinces were split into commanderies governed by Administrators (taishou, 太守), who are overseen by Regional Inspectors (cishi, 刺史) of a province. Regional Inspectors and Governors were not allowed to serve in their native commandery. Later Regional Inspectors were replaced by Regional Governors (zhoumu, 州牧) in late Eastern Han, who controlled the provinces directly.

After 104 BC, the imperial capital was governed by the Three Guardians (sanfu 三輔): Metropolitan Governor (jingzhaoyin 京兆尹), Guardian of the Left (zuopingyi 左馮翊), and Guardian of the Right (youfufeng 右扶風). After 89 BC, these three positions were subordinated by the Military Commandant (sili xiaowei 司隸校尉) who reported directly to the emperor.

=== Recruitment ===
Han officialdom was ruled by an aristocracy down to the county level. Candidates for offices recommended by the provinces were examined by the Ministry of Rites and then presented to the emperor. Some candidates for clerical positions would be given a test to determine whether they could memorize nine thousand Chinese characters. The tests administered during the Han dynasty did not offer formal entry into government posts. Recruitment and appointment in the Han dynasty were primarily through recommendations by aristocrats and local officials. Recommended individuals were also primarily aristocrats. In theory, recommendations were based on a combination of reputation and ability but it's not certain how well this worked in practice. Oral examinations on policy issues were sometimes conducted personally by the emperor himself during Western Han times.

Although executive officials were appointed by the central government, they were allowed to freely appoint their own sons and favored friends. An appointed official first served one year in probationary status and then obtained indefinite tenure with three year intervals, at which point they were assessed by their supervisors for promotion, demotion, or dismissal. During the reign of Emperor Wu (r. 9 March 141 BC – 29 March 87 BC), every commandery and kingdom was called on to nominate one or two men for appointment each year. Later the number of nominations was fixed to one per 200,000 people. From 165 BC onward, nominees were given written examinations to confirm their literacy and learning. In 124 BC, Emperor Wu established the Taixue with a faculty of five Erudites (boshi 博士) and student body of 50, recommended by Commandery Governors, that grew to 3,000 by the end of the millennium. Students studied the classics at the Taixue for one year and then sat a written graduation exam, after which they were either appointed or returned home to seek positions on the commandery staff. Officials were paid on a monthly basis in both grain and coin corresponding to their rank. The number of graduates who went on to hold office were few. The examinations did not offer a formal route to commissioned office and the primary path to office remained through recommendations.

Provinces of the Han and Western Jin dynasties
Name	Traditional Chinese	Simplified Chinese	Pinyin	Capital		Approximate extent in terms of modern locations
Name	Traditional Chinese	Simplified Chinese	Pinyin	Ancient name	Modern location	Approximate extent in terms of modern locations
Bingzhou*	并州	并州	Bīngzhōu	Jinyang	southwest of Taiyuan	Shanxi
Jiaozhou*	交州	交州	Jiāozhōu	Longbian	East of Hanoi	northern Vietnam
Jingzhou*	荆州	荆州	Jīngzhōu	Jiangling		Hubei, Hunan
Jizhou*	冀州	冀州	Jìzhōu	Xindu	Jizhou City	southern Hebei
Liangzhou*	涼州	凉州	Liángzhōu	Guzang	Wuwei	western Gansu
Qingzhou*	青州	青州	Qīngzhōu	Linzi	east of Zibo	eastern Shandong
Xuzhou*	徐州	徐州	Xúzhōu	Pengcheng	Xuzhou	northern Jiangsu
Yangzhou*	揚州	扬州	Yángzhōu	Jianye	Nanjing	southern Jiangsu, southern Anhui, Jiangxi, Zhejiang, Fujian, Shanghai
Yanzhou*	兗州	兖州	Yǎnzhōu	Linqiu	northwest of Yuncheng County	western Shandong
Yizhou*	益州	益州	Yìzhōu	Chengdu		central Sichuan, Guizhou
Yongzhou*	雍州	雍州	Yōngzhōu	Chang'an	northwest of Xi'an	central Shaanxi
Youzhou*	幽州	幽州	Yōuzhōu	Zhuoxian		northern Hebei, Beijing, Tianjin
Yuzhou*	豫州	豫州	Yùzhōu	Chenxian	Huaiyang	southern Henan, northern Anhui
Pingzhou	平州	平州	Píngzhōu	Xiangping	Liaoyang	Liaoning, northern Korea
Qinzhou	秦州	秦州	Qínzhōu	Jixian	east of Gangu	southern Gansu
Liangzhou	梁州	梁州	Liángzhōu	Nanzheng	Hanzhong	southern Shaanxi, eastern Sichuan, Chongqing
Ningzhou	寧州	宁州	Níngzhōu	Dianchi	southeast of Kunming	Yunnan
Guangzhou	廣州	广州	Guǎngzhōu	Panyu	Guangzhou	Guangdong, eastern Guangxi
Sizhou	司州	司州	Sīzhōu	Luoyang		central Henan, southern Shanxi

== Sui dynasty (581–618) ==
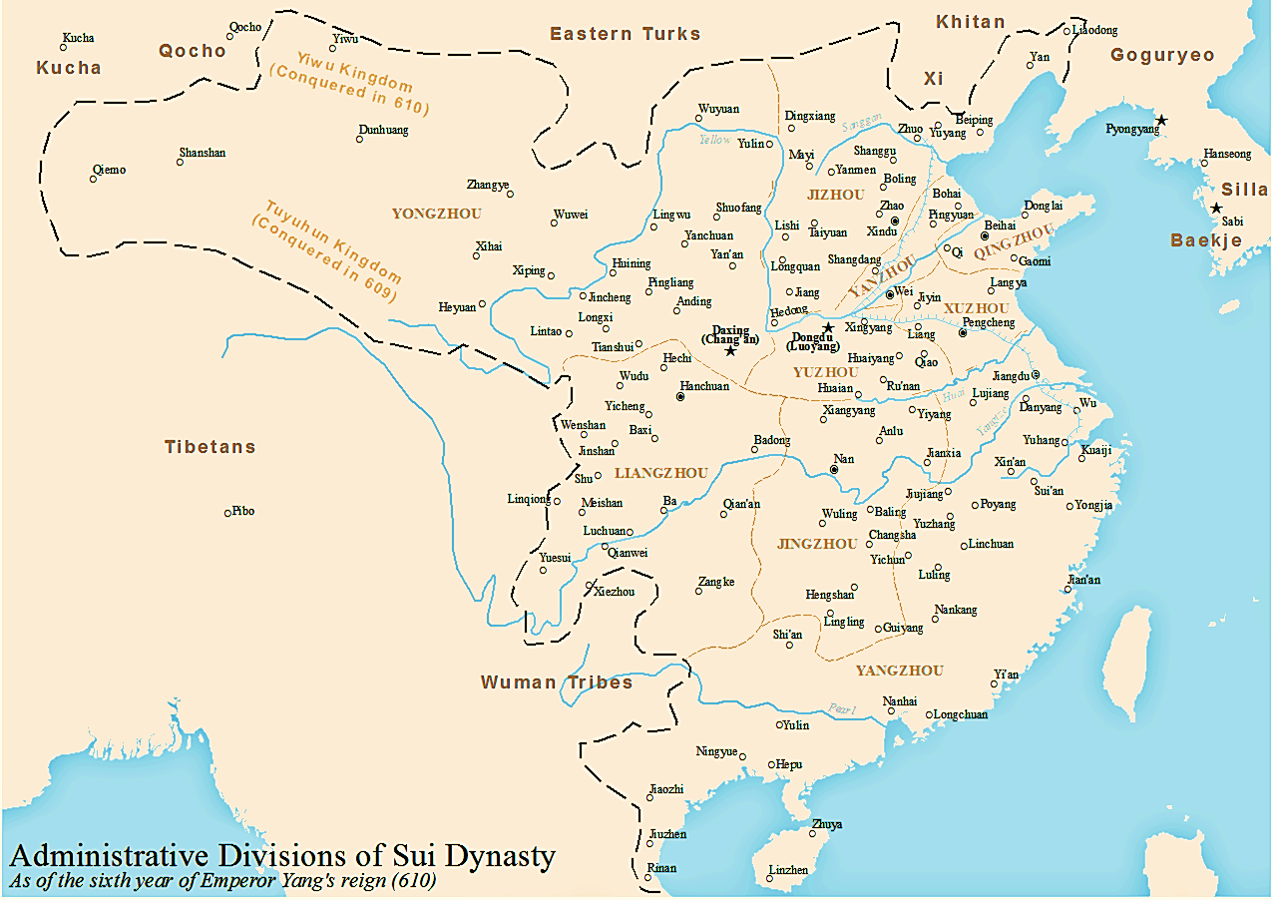
Sui provinces, ca. 610

The period of dynastic turmoil between the Han and Sui dynasties led to proliferation of counties, commanderies, and regions, often set up to administer the large refugee populations moving across China. In 586, Emperor Wen of Sui abolished commanderies and left provinces in direct control of counties. In 605, Emperor Yang of Sui revived the commandery. In the early years of the Sui dynasty, Area Commanders-in-chief (zongguan 總管) ruled as semi-autonomous warlords, but they were gradually replaced with Branch Departments of State Affairs (xing taisheng 行臺省).

In 587, the Sui dynasty mandated every province to nominate three "cultivated talents" (xiucai 秀才) per year for appointment. In 599, all capital officials of rank five and above were required to make nominations for appointment in several categories.

=== Imperial examinations ===
Examination categories for "classicists" (mingjing ke 明經科) and "cultivated talents" (xiucai ke 秀才科) were introduced. Classicists were tested on the Confucian canon, which was considered an easy task at the time, so those who passed were awarded posts in the lower rungs of officialdom. Cultivated talents were tested on matters of statecraft as well as the Confucian canon. In AD 607, Emperor Yang established a new category of examinations for the "presented scholar" (jinshi ke 进士科). These three categories of examination were the origins of the imperial examination system that would last until 1905. Consequently, the year 607 is also considered by many to be the real beginning of the imperial examination system. The Sui dynasty was itself short lived however and the system was not developed further until much later.

The imperial examinations did not significantly shift recruitment selection in practice during the Sui dynasty. Schools at the capital still produced students for appointment. Inheritance of official status was also still practiced. Men of the merchant and artisan classes were still barred from officialdom. However the reign of Emperor Wen (r. 4 March 581 – 13 August 604) did see much greater expansion of government authority over officials. Under Emperor Wen, all officials down to the county level had to be appointed by the Department of State Affairs in the capital and were subjected to annual merit rating evaluations. Regional Inspectors and County Magistrates had to be transferred every three years and their subordinates every four years. They were not allowed to bring their parents or adult children with them upon reassignment of territorial administration. The Sui did not establish any hereditary kingdoms or marquisates of the Han sort. To compensate, nobles were given substantial stipends and staff. Aristocratic officials were ranked based on their pedigree with distinctions such as "high expectations", "pure", and "impure" so that they could be awarded offices appropriately.

Provinces of the Sui dynasty
Name	Traditional Chinese	Simplified Chinese	Pinyin	Capital		Approximate extent in terms of modern locations
Name	Traditional Chinese	Simplified Chinese	Pinyin	Ancient name	Modern location	Approximate extent in terms of modern locations
Yongzhou	雍州	雍州	Yōngzhōu	?	?	Guanzhong, Gansu, and the Upper Yellow basin
Jizhou	冀州	冀州	Jìzhōu	?	?	Shanxi and Northern Hebei, including modern Beijing and Tianjin
Yanzhou	兗州	兖州	Yǎnzhōu	?	?	Lower Yellow River area- west of Qingzhou and east of Jizhou
Qingzhou	青州	青州	Qīngzhōu	?	?	Shandong Peninsula
Yuzhou	豫州	豫州	Yùzhōu	?	?	Henan
Xuzhou	徐州	徐州	Xúzhōu	?	?	Modern Xuzhou area- southern Shandong and northern Jiangsu
Liangzhou	梁州	梁州	Liángzhōu	?	?	Upper Yangtze- Sichuan Basin + south of the Qinling
Jingzhou	荆州	荆州	Jīngzhōu	?	?	Central Yangtze
Yangzhou	揚州	扬州	Yángzhōu	?	?	Lower Yangtze, entire SE Coast, Hainan, and Northern Vietnam

== Tang dynasty (618–907) ==
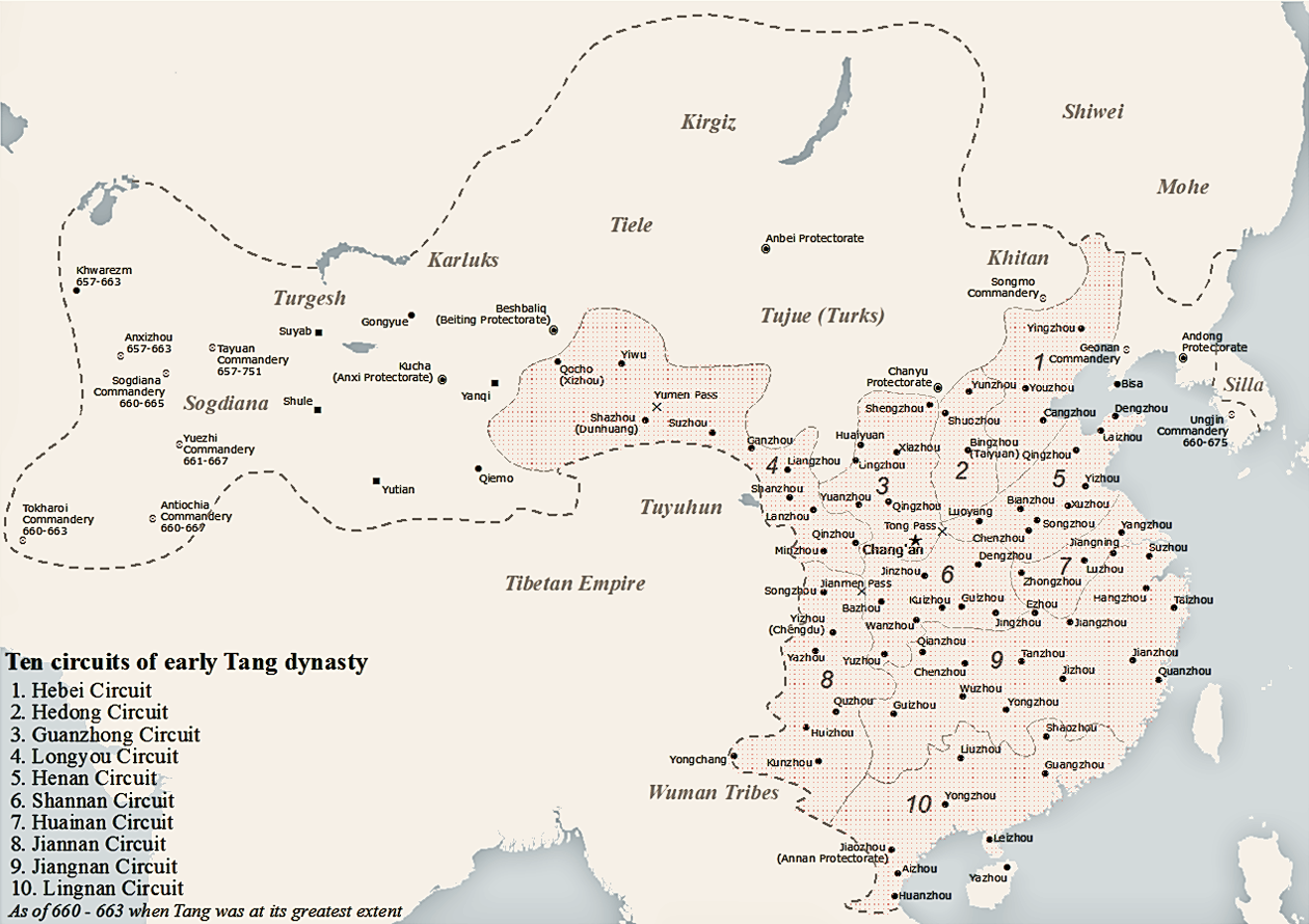
Tang circuits, ca. 660

Tang circuits, ca. 742

At the beginning of the Tang dynasty, Emperor Taizong introduced "circuits" to help monitor the operation of prefectures (rather than a new primary level of administration). The circuit was assigned a Surveillance Commissioner (ancha shi 按察使), who functioned as an overall coordinator rather than a governor, and visited prefectures and checked up on the performance of officials. In 639, these 10 circuits were oversaw 43 commanderies, themselves subdivided into 358 prefectures. A normal prefecture was administered by a Prefect. Sometimes a prefecture could be designated an Area Command (dudu fu 都督府) under an Area Commander (dudu) and a few prefectures could be grouped together into a Superior Area Command (da dudu fu 大都督府) under a Commander-in-chief (da dudu). There were three Superior Prefectures known as Jingzhao (in the Chang'an area), Henan (in the Luoyang area), and Taiyuan (in modern Shanxi Province). Each Superior Prefecture was nominally administered by an Imperial Prince but usually another official was actually in charge. Area Commands were later replaced by Defense Commands (zhen 鎮) under Military Commissioners (jiedushi 節度使). After the An Lushan Rebellion (16 December 755 – 17 February 763), the role of the Surveillance Commissioner shifted to that of a more direct civil governor while many Military Commissioners became autonomous warlords in all but name. Sometimes borderlands were designated a Protectorate (duhu fu 都護府) under a Protector (duhu).

In 733, Emperor Xuanzong expanded the number of circuits to 15 by establishing separate circuits for the areas around Chang'an and Luoyang, and by splitting the large Shannan and Jiangnan circuits into 2 and 3 new circuits respectively. He also established a system of permanent inspecting commissioners, though without executive powers.

=== Expansion of the imperial examinations ===
During the Tang dynasty, candidates were either recommended by their schools or had to register for exams at their home prefecture. In 693, Wu Zetian expanded the examination system by allowing commoners and gentry previously disqualified by their non-elite backgrounds to take the tests.

Six categories of regular civil-service examinations were organized by the Department of State Affairs and held by the Ministry of Rites: cultivated talents, classicists, presented scholars, legal experts, writing experts, and arithmetic experts. Emperor Xuanzong of Tang also added categories for Daoism and apprentices. The hardest of these examination categories, the presented scholar jinshi degree, became more prominent over time until it superseded all other examinations. By the late Tang the jinshi degree became a prerequisite for appointment into higher offices. Appointments by recommendation were also required to take examinations. However candidates who passed the exams were not automatically granted office. They still had to pass a quality evaluation by the Ministry of Rites, after which they were allowed to wear official robes.

Successful candidates reported to the Ministry of Personnel for placement examinations. Unassigned officials and honorary title holders were expected to take placement examinations at regular intervals. Non-assigned status could last a very long time especially when waiting for a substantive appointment. After being assigned to office, a junior official was given an annual merit rating. There was no specified term limit, but most junior officials served for at least three years or more in one post. Senior officials served indefinitely at the pleasure of the emperor.

The Tang emperors placed the palace exam graduates, the jinshi, in important government posts, where they came into conflict with hereditary elites. During the reign of Emperor Xuanzong of Tang (713–56), about a third of the Grand Chancellors appointed were jinshi, but by the time of Emperor Xianzong of Tang (806–21), three fifths of the Grand Chancellors appointed were jinshi. This change in the way government was organized dealt a real blow to the aristocrats, but they did not sit idly by and wait to become obsolete. Instead they themselves entered the examinations to gain the privileges associated with it. By the end of the dynasty, the aristocratic class had produced 116 jinshi, so that they remained a significant influence in the government. Hereditary privileges were also not completely done away with. The sons of high ministers and great generals had the right to hold minor offices without taking the examinations. In addition, the number of graduates were not only small, but also formed their own clique in the government based around the examiners and the men they passed. In effect the graduates became another interest group the emperor had to contend with.

== Liao dynasty (916–1125) ==
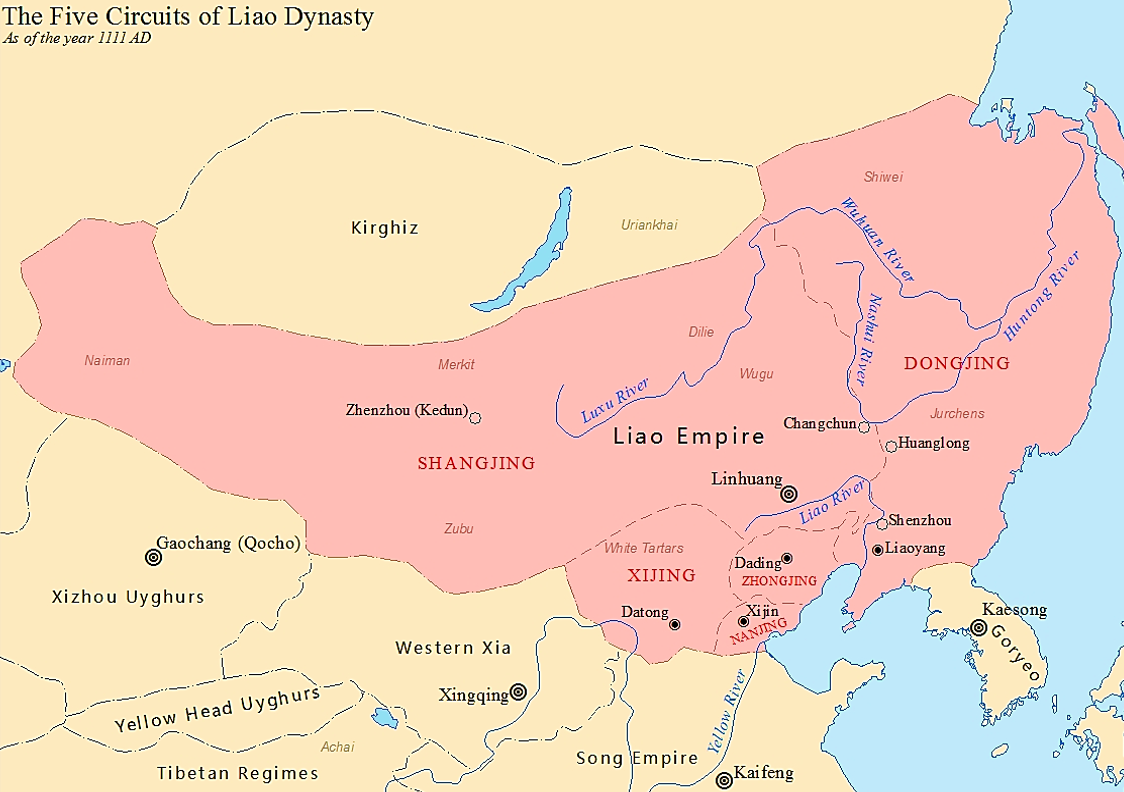
The Five circuits of Liao in 1111 AD

The Khitan-led Liao dynasty was divided between a nomadic tribal Northern Administration and a sedentary Chinese Southern Establishment. They were each headed by a Prime Minister, the northern one appointed by the Xiao consort clan, and the southern one appointed by the ruling Yelü clan. The Southern Establishments were divided into five "circuits", each with a capital city. Each circuit except for the one dominated by the Supreme Capital (shangjing 上京) was ruled by a Regent (liushou 留守). Under the Regent were Governors (yin' 尹) of prefectures who ruled below them Magistrates of counties. Under the Northern Administration, Khitans were organized around an ordo, the moving camp of a chief. Throughout the duration of the Liao dynasty, the number of ordos fluctuated between 10 and 44. The tribal vassals of the Liao were organized into territories known as routes (lu 路) headed by a tribal chief.

The southern commissioners were usually members of the Yelü royal clan, the northern commissioners mostly members of the Xiao consort clan. The administration of the Northern Region was mainly, though not exclusively, staffed by Khitan holding traditional Khitan titles. Its most powerful officers were the Khitan commissioners for military affairs, the prime ministers of the Northern and Southern administrations (Beifu zaixiang, Nanfu zaixiang (Note: 北府宰相, 南府宰相)), the Northern and Southern Great Kings (Bei Dawang, Nan Dawang (Note: 北大王, 南大王)), both of whom were members of the royal clan, and the commander in chief (yuyue). These men controlled all military and tribal affairs, the selection of military commanders, the disposition of the tribal herds, and the allocation of pastures. Beneath them was a bewildering array of tribal officials, an office for the royal clan of the former Bohai state, and a range of offices providing services to the imperial house: artisans, physicians, huntsmen, and commissioners responsible for the royal herds, stud farms, and stables.

The government of the Southern Region was designed in imitation of a Tang model. It was based, as was the government of the Northern Region, at the Supreme Capital, where it had its main offices. It had the traditional groups of elder statesmen, the Three Preceptors (san shi) and the Three Dukes (san gong) to act as imperial advisers, and a complex bureaucracy at the head of which were three ministries similar to the three central ministries (san sheng) of early Tang... but only the Secretariat played any significant role in political decisions. ... the Southern Administration was essentially an executive organization for the southern areas and their settled population. The high-sounding titles of its officers should not conceal the fact that routine decision making and all military authority (southern officials were specifically excluded from decisions on military affairs at court) were concentrated in the emperor's Khitan entourage drawn from the Northern Administration.

— Denis Twitchett and Klaus-Peter Tietze

Imperial examinations were only held for the Southern Establishments until the last decade of the dynasty when Khitans found it an acceptable avenue for advancing their careers. The examinations focused primarily on lyric-meter poetry and rhapsodies. Recruitment through examinations was irregular and all offices of note were hereditary in nature and held by Khitans.

Circuits of the Liao dynasty
Name	Chinese Name	Capital	Modern name of capital	Approximate extent in terms of modern locations
Shangjing	上京道	Linhuang Fu	Bairin Left Banner	Eastern Inner Mongolia, Outer Mongolia
Dongjing	东京道	Liaoyang Fu	Liaoyang	Heilongjiang, Jilin, Liaoning and parts of Russia
Xijing	西京道	Datong Fu	Datong	Central Inner Mongolia, Northern Shanxi and Northwestern Hebei
Nanjing	南京道	Xijin Fu	Beijing	Beijing, Tianjin and Northern Hebei
Zhongjing	中京道	Dading Fu	Ningcheng	Northeastern Hebei, Western Liaoning

== Song dynasty (960–1279) ==
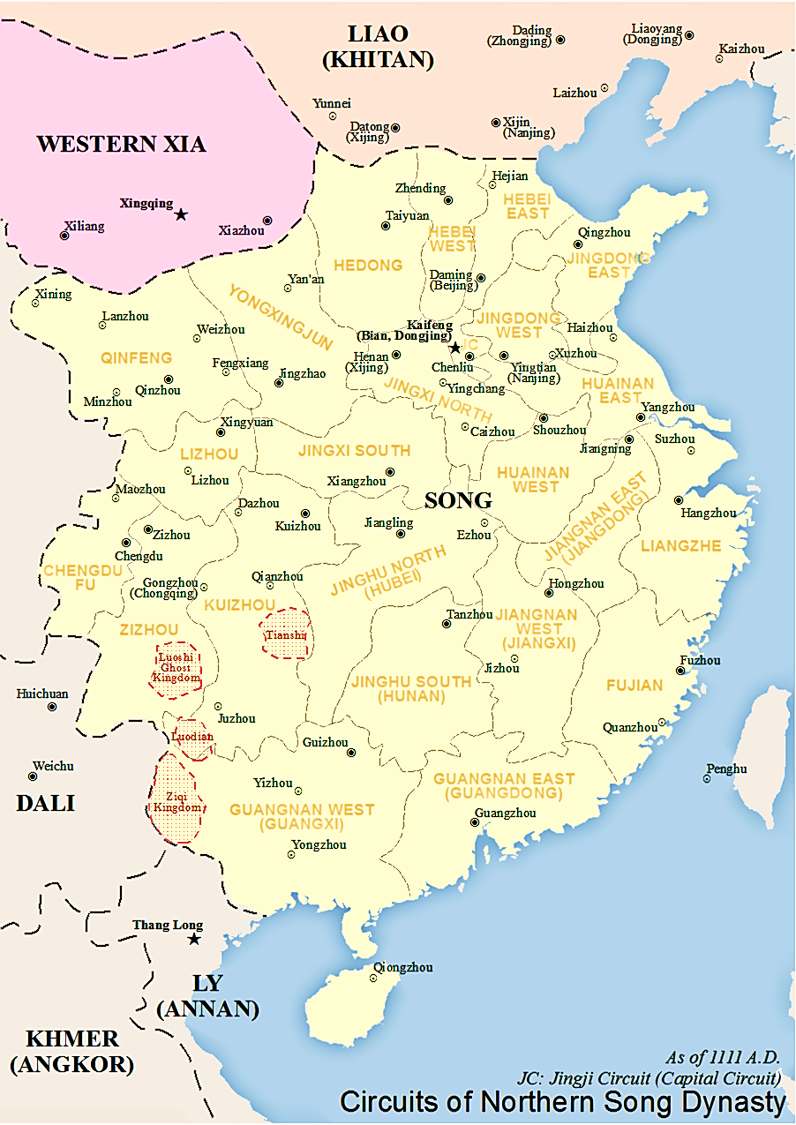
Circuits of Northern Song dynasty (as of 1111 AD)

The Song dynasty continued the Tang system of circuit, prefecture, and county. The Military Prefecture was called an "army" (jun 軍) and a handful of prefectures containing mines and salterns were designated Industrial Prefectures (jian 監). The prefectures were nominally administered by a Prefect, but in practice the central government appointed another Manager of the Affairs to administer groups of prefectures. Actions by Prefects also had to be signed off by a prefectural supervisor. Like the Tang before them, the Song used circuits not as provincial governorships but regions for Commissioners to coordinate government activity. Four Commissions were assigned to every circuit, each tasked with a different administrative activity: military, fiscal, judicial, and supply.

=== Scholar bureaucracy ===
The imperial examinations became the primary method of recruitment for official posts. More than a hundred palace examinations were held during the dynasty, resulting in a greater number of jinshi degrees rewarded. The examinations were opened to adult Chinese males, with some restrictions, including even individuals from the occupied northern territories of the Liao and Jin dynasties. Many individuals of low social status were able to rise to political prominence through success in the imperial examination. The process of studying for the examination tended to be time-consuming and costly, requiring time to spare and tutors. Most of the candidates came from the numerically small but relatively wealthy land-owning scholar-official class.

Successful candidates were appointed to office almost immediately and waiting periods between appointments were not long. Annual merit ratings were taken and officials could request evaluation for reassignment. Officials who wished to escape harsh assignments often requested reassignment as a state supervisor of a Taoist temple or monastery. Senior officials in the capital also sometimes nominated themselves for the position of Prefect in obscure prefectures.

Although quite a few Northern Song families or lineages succeeded in producing high officials over several generations, none could begin to rival the great families of the Six Dynasties and Tang in longevity, prestige, or perhaps even power. Most important, the promise of the examinations transformed learning from an elite concern to a preoccupation. Education became less the domain of scholarly families comprising one portion of elite society and more an activity urged upon academically promising boys and young men throughout elite society.

— John W. Chaffee

=== Hereditary prefectures ===
When Emperor Taizu of Song expanded southwest he encountered four powerful families: the Yang of Bozhou, the Song of Manzhou, the Tian of Sizhou, and the Long of Nanning. Long Yanyao, patriarch of the Long family, submitted to Song rule in 967 with the guarantee that he could rule Nanning as his personal property, to be passed down through his family without Song interference. In return the Long family was required to present tribute to the Song court. The other families were also offered the same conditions, which they accepted. Although they were included among the official prefectures of the Song dynasty, in practice, these families and their estates constituted independent hereditary kingdoms within the Song realm.

In 975, Emperor Taizong of Song ordered Song Jingyang and Long Hantang to attack the Mu'ege kingdom and drive them back across the Yachi River. Whatever territory they seized they were allowed to keep. After a year of fighting, they succeeded in the endeavor.

Circuits of the Northern Song dynasty
Name	Traditional Chinese	Simplified Chinese	Pinyin	Capital		Approximate extent in terms of modern locations
Name	Traditional Chinese	Simplified Chinese	Pinyin	Ancient name	Modern location	Approximate extent in terms of modern locations
Chengdufu	成都府	成都府	Chéngdūfǔ	Chengdu		central Sichuan
Fujian	福建	福建	Fújiàn	Fuzhou		Fujian
Guangnan East	廣南東	广南东	Guǎngnándōng	Guangzhou		eastern Guangdong
Guangnan West	廣南西	广南西	Guǎngnánxī	Guizhou	Guilin	western Guangdong, Guangxi, Hainan
Hebei East	河北東	河北东	Héběidōng	Beijing	Daming County, Hebei	eastern Hebei
Hebei West	河北西	河北西	Héběixī	Zhending	Zhengding County, Hebei	western Hebei
Hedong	河東	河东	Hédōng	Taiyuan		Shanxi
Huainan East	淮南東	淮南东	Huáinándōng	Yangzhou		central Jiangsu
Huainan West	淮南西	淮南西	Huáinánxī	Shouzhou	Fengtai County, Anhui	central Anhui
Jiangnan East	江南東	江南东	Jiāngnándōng	Jiangning Fu	Nanjing	southern Anhui
Jiangnan West	江南西	江南西	Jiāngnánxī	Hongzhou	Nanchang	Jiangxi
Jingdong East	京東東	京东东	Jīngdōngdōng	Qingzhou	Qingzhou, Shandong	eastern Shandong
Jingdong West	京東西	京东西	Jīngdōngxī	Nanjing	south of Shangqiu, Henan	western Shandong
Jinghu North	荊湖北	荆湖北	Jīnghúběi	Jiangling		Hubei, western Hunan
Jinghu South	荊湖南	荆湖南	Jīnghúnán	Tanzhou	Changsha	Hunan
Jingji	京畿	京畿	Jīngjī	Chenliu	Chenliu, Kaifeng, Henan	Kaifeng and environs
Jingxi North	京西北	京西北	Jīngxīběi	Xijing	Luoyang	central Henan
Jingxi South	京西南	京西南	Jīngxīnán	Xiangzhou	Xiangfan	southern Henan, northern Hubei
Kuizhou	夔州	夔州	Kuízhōu	Kuizhou	Fengjie County, Chongqing	Chongqing, eastern Sichuan, Guizhou
Liangzhe	兩浙	两浙	Liǎngzhè	Hangzhou		Zhejiang, southern Jiangsu, Shanghai
Lizhou	利州	利州	Lìzhōu	Xingyuan	Hanzhong	northern Sichuan, southern Shaanxi
Qinfeng	秦鳳	秦凤	Qínfèng	Qinzhou	Tianshui	southern Gansu
Yongxingjun	永興軍	永兴军	Yǒngxīngjūn	Jingzhao	Xi'an	Shaanxi
Zizhou	梓州	梓州	Zǐzhōu	Zizhou	Santai County, Sichuan	central southern Sichuan

== Jin dynasty (1115–1234) ==
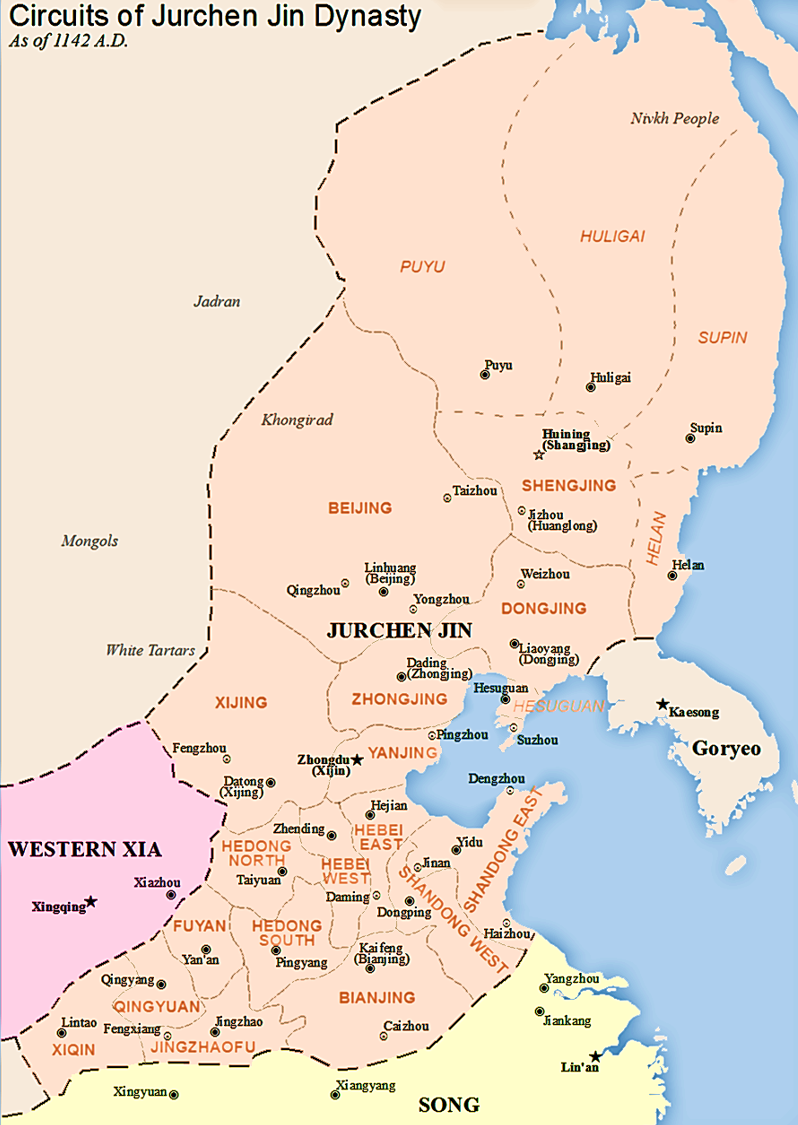
Circuits of Jurchen Jin dynasty, as of 1142 A.D.

The Jurchen-led Jin dynasty was divided into 19 routes, five of which were governed from capitals under the control of Regents. The 14 routes not controlled by capitals were under the administration of Area Commands (zongguanfu 總管府). Under the routes were prefectures. The Jurchens adopted a more Chinese administration than the Khitans. They instituted an examination system in 1123 and adopted the triennial examination cycle in 1129. Two separate examinations were held to accommodate their former Liao and Song subjects. In the north, examinations focused on lyric-meter poetry and rhapsodies while in the south, Confucian Classics were tested. During the reign of Emperor Xizong of Jin (r. 1135–1150), the contents of both examinations were unified and examinees were tested on both genres. Emperor Zhangzong of Jin (r. 1189–1208) abolished the prefectural examinations. Emperor Shizong of Jin (r. 1161–1189) created the first examination conducted in the Jurchen language, with a focus on political writings and poetry. Graduates of the Jurchen examination were called "treatise graduates" (celun jinshi 策論進士) to distinguish them from the regular Chinese jinshi.

Posts were regularly filled by examination graduates and it was not uncommon for one in three candidates to pass. An average of 200 Metropolitan Graduate Degrees were handed out per year. Although Chinese subjects were able to obtain offices through the examinations, a regional quota assured that northerners (principally Jurchens) passed more consistently and were more quickly promoted upon obtaining office. Often Jurchen examinees had to demonstrate little more than literacy to pass. Chinese officials also faced discrimination, at times physical, while Jurchens retained all final decision-making powers within the Jin government.

Circuits of China under the Jin dynasty and the Southern Song dynasty
Name	Traditional Chinese	Simplified Chinese	Pinyin	Capital		Approximate extent in terms of modern locations
Name	Traditional Chinese	Simplified Chinese	Pinyin	Ancient name	Modern location	Approximate extent in terms of modern locations
Jin dynasty
Beijing	北京	北京	Běijīng	Beijing	Ningcheng County, Inner Mongolia	eastern Manchuria
Damingfu	大名府	大名府	Dàmíngfǔ	Daming Fu	Daming County, Hebei	border of Henan, Hebei, Shandong
Dongjing	東京	东京	Dōngjīng	Dongjing	Liaoyang	Liaoning
Fengxiang	鳳翔	凤翔	Fèngxiáng	Fengxiang Fu	Fengxiang County, Shaanxi	western Shaanxi, eastern Gansu
Fuyan	鄜延	鄜延	Fūyán	Yan'an		northern Shaanxi
Hebei East	河北東	河北东	Héběidōng	Hejian	Hejian, Hebei	eastern Hebei
Hebei West	河北西	河北西	Héběixī	Zhending	Zhengding County, Hebei	western Hebei
Hedong North	河東北	河东北	Hédōngběi	Taiyuan		northern Shanxi
Hedong South	河東南	河东南	Hédōngnán	Pingyang	Linfen	southern Shanxi
Jingzhaofu	京兆府	京兆府	Jīngzhàofǔ	Jingzhao Fu	Xi'an	central Shaanxi
Lintao	臨洮	临洮	Líntáo	Lintao	Lintao County, Gansu	southern Gansu
Nanjing	南京	南京	Nánjīng	Nanjing	Kaifeng	Henan, northern Anhui
Qingyuan	慶原	庆原	Qìngyuán	Qingyang		eastern Gansu
Shandong East	山東東	山东东	Shāndōngdōng	Yidu Fu	Qingzhou, Shandong	eastern Shandong
Shandong West	山東西	山东西	Shāndōngxī	Dongping Fu	Dongping County, Shandong	western Shandong
Shangjing	上京	上京	Shàngjīng	Shangjing	Acheng, Heilongjiang	northern Manchuria
Xianping	咸平	咸平	Xiánpíng	Xianping Fu	Kaiyuan, Liaoning	northern Liaoning
Xijing	西京	西京	Xījīng	Xijing	Datong	northern Shanxi, central Inner Mongolia
Zhongdu	中都	中都	Zhōngdū	Zhongdu	Beijing	northern Hebei, Beijing, Tianjin
Southern Song dynasty
Chengdufu	成都府	成都府	Chéngdūfǔ	Chengdu		central Sichuan
Fujian	福建	福建	Fújiàn	Fuzhou		Fujian
Guangnan East	廣南東	广南东	Guǎngnándōng	Guangzhou		eastern Guangdong
Guangnan West	廣南西	广南西	Guǎngnánxī	Jingjiang Fu	Guilin	western Guangdong, Guangxi, Hainan
Huainan East	淮南東	淮南东	Huáinándōng	Yangzhou		central Jiangsu
Huainan West	淮南西	淮南西	Huáinánxī	Luzhou	Hefei	central Anhui
Jiangnan East	江南東	江南东	Jiāngnándōng	Jiangning Fu	Nanjing	southern Anhui
Jiangnan West	江南西	江南	Jiāngnánxī	Longxing Fu	Nanchang	Jiangxi
Jinghu North	荊湖北	荊湖北	Jīnghúběi	Jiangling		Hubei, western Hunan
Jinghu South	荊湖南	荊湖南	Jīnghúnán	Tanzhou	Changsha	Hunan
Jingxi South	京西南	京西南	Jīngxīnán	Xiangyang Fu	Xiangfan	southern Henan, northern Hubei
Kuizhou	夔州	夔州	Kuízhōu	Kuizhou	Fengjie County, Chongqing	Chongqing, eastern Sichuan, Guizhou
Liangzhe East	兩浙東	兩浙东	Liǎngzhèdōng	Shaoxing		central and southern Zhejiang
Liangzhe West	兩浙西	兩浙西	Liǎngzhèxī	Hangzhou		northern Zhejiang, southern Jiangsu, Shanghai
Lizhou East	利州東	利州东	Lìzhōudōng	Xingyuan	Hanzhong	northern Sichuan, southern Shaanxi
Lizhou West	利州西	利州西	Lìzhōuxī	Mianzhou	Lueyang, Shaanxi	northern Sichuan, southern Gansu
Tongchuanfu	潼川府	潼川府	Tóngchuānfǔ	Luzhou		central southern Sichuan

== Yuan dynasty (1271–1368) ==
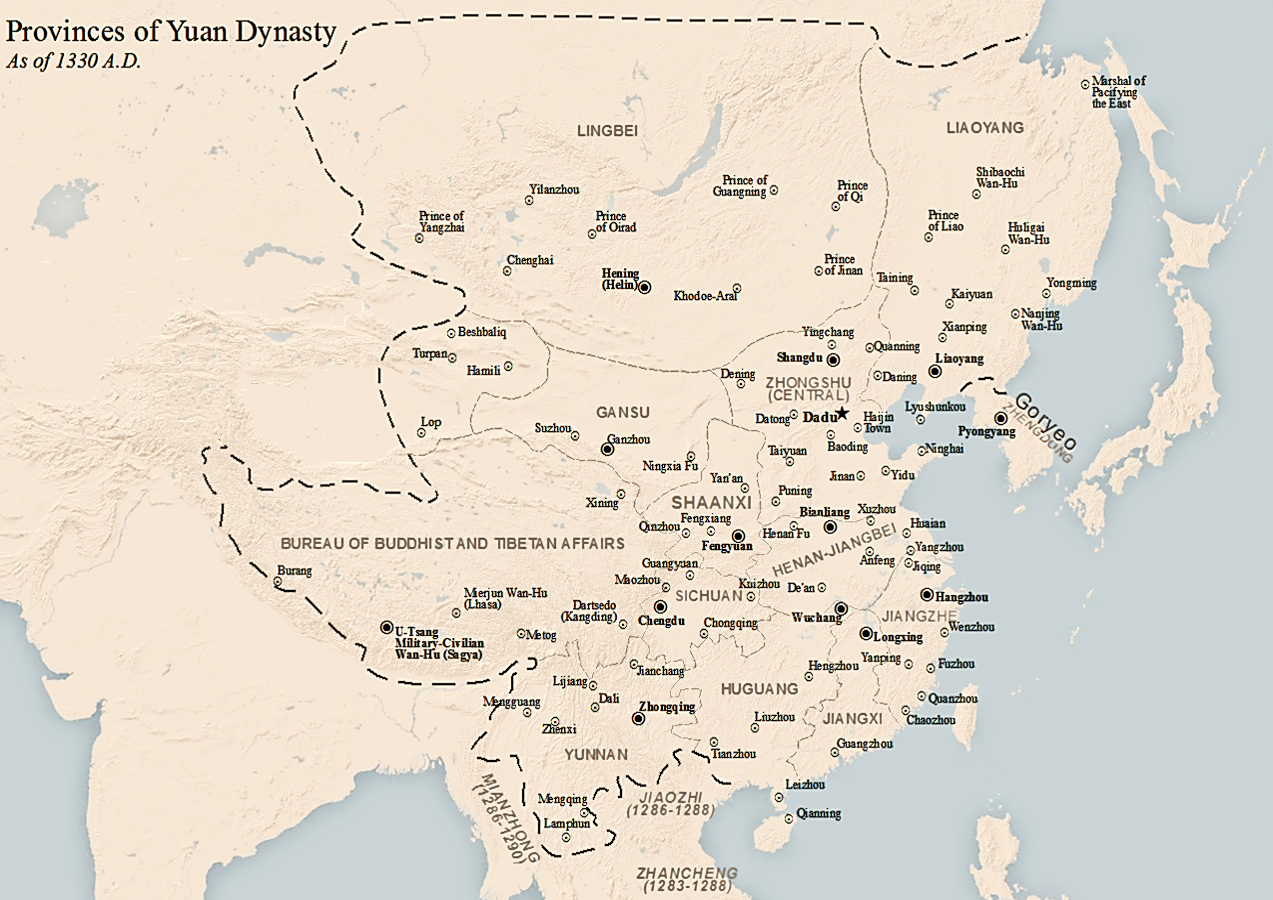
Yuan provinces in 1330 AD.

Under the Mongol-led Yuan dynasty, the largest administrative division was the province, also known as a Branch Secretariat (xing zhongshu sheng). A province was governed by two Managers of Governmental Affairs (pingchang zhengshi). Occasionally a Grand Chancellor (chengxiang) was put in charge of an entire province. It is questionable how much authority the central government had over the provinces as they were essentially the administrative bases of Mongol nobles. Between the provinces and the central government were two agencies: the Branch Bureau of Military Affairs (xing shumi yuan) and the Branch Censorate (xing yushi tai). The Military Branch handled military affairs and had jurisdiction over vaguely defined territories known as Regions (chu 處). There were three Branch Censorates that handled overseeing the provincial affairs of the Yuan dynasty.

Below the provinces were circuits with agencies headed by Commissioners who coordinated matters between the provincial level authorities and lower-level routes, prefectures, and districts. The route was governed by an Overseer and a Commander. Below routes were prefectures headed by an Overseer and a Prefect. At the lowest level, below the prefectures, were counties headed by an Overseer and a Magistrate. The capital Khanbaliq was governed by the Dadu Route under the administration of two Police Commissions, while the summer capital Shangdu was under another Police Commission.

All residents of the Yuan dynasty were grouped into four categories: Mongols, Semu, Han, and Manzi. Semu were subjects of the Yuan coming from the west of China, Han were the former subjects of the Jin dynasty, and the Manzi were all former subjects of the Song dynasty. All important government positions were held by Mongols and Semu, with some minor offices held by Han, while Manzi were relegated to local offices in their own area. Mongol Overseers were assigned to every office down to the county level.

Imperial examinations were ceased for a time with the defeat of the Song in 1279 by Kublai Khan. One of Kublai's main advisers, Liu Bingzhong, recommended restoring the examination system, however Kublai distrusted the examinations and did not heed his advice. Kublai believed that Confucian learning was not needed for government posts and was opposed to such a commitment to the Chinese language and to the Chinese scholars who were so adept at it, as well as its accompanying ideology. He wished to appoint his own people without relying on an apparatus inherited from a newly conquered and sometimes rebellious country.

The examination system was revived in 1315 with significant changes during the reign of Ayurbarwada Buyantu Khan. The new examination system organized its examinees into regional categories in a way which favored Mongols and severely disadvantaged the Manzi. A quota system both for number of candidates and degrees awarded was instituted based on the classification of the four groups, those being the Mongols (and Semu), Han, and Manzi, with further restrictions by province favoring the northeast of the empire (Mongolia) and its vicinities. A quota of 300 persons was fixed for provincial examinations with 75 persons from each group. The metropolitan exam had a quota of 100 persons with 25 persons from each group. Candidates were enrolled on two lists with the Mongols and Semu located on the left and the Han and Manzi on the right. Examinations were written in Chinese and based on Confucian and Neo-Confucian texts but the Mongols and Semu received easier questions to answer than the Chinese. Successful candidates were awarded one of three ranks. All graduates were eligible for official appointment.

Under the revised system the yearly averages for examination degrees awarded was about 21. The way in which the four regional categories were divided tended to favor the Mongols, Semu, and Han, despite the Manzi being by far the largest portion of the population. The 1290 census figures record some 12,000,000 households (about 48% of the total Yuan population) for South China, versus 2,000,000 North Chinese households, and the populations of Mongols and Semu were both less. While South China was technically allotted 75 candidates for each provincial exam, only 28 Han Chinese from South China were included among the 300 candidates, the rest of the South China slots (47) being occupied by resident Mongols or Semu, although 47 "racial South Chinese" who were not residents of South China were approved as candidates.

Recruitment by examination during the Yuan dynasty constituted a very minor part of the Yuan administration. Hereditary Mongol nobility formed the elite nucleus of the government. Initially the Mongols drew administrators from their subjects but in 1261, attempts were made by Kublai to increase Mongol personnel by ordering the establishment of Mongolian schools to draw officials from. The School for the Sons of the State was established in 1271 to give two or three years of training for the sons of Imperial Bodyguards so that they might become suitable for official recruitment. Officials serving in the capital were nominally supposed to receive merit ratings every 30 months, for demotion or promotion, but in practice government posts were inherited from father to son.

=== Tusi ===
Southwestern tribal chieftainships were organized under the tusi system. The tusi system was inspired by the Jimi system (Chinese: 羈縻制度) implemented in regions of ethnic minorities groups during the Tang dynasty. It was established as a specific political term during the Yuan dynasty and was used as a political institution to administer newly acquired territories following their conquest of the Dali Kingdom in 1253.

Members of the former Duan imperial clan were appointed as governors-general with nominal authority using the title "Dali Chief Steward" (Chinese: 大理總管, p Dàlǐ Zǒngguǎn), and local leaders were co-opted under a variety of titles as administrators of the region. Some credit the Turkoman governor Sayyid Ajjal Shams al-Din Omar with introducing the system into China. Duan Xingzhi, the last king of Dali, was appointed as the first local ruler, and he accepted the stationing of a pacification commissioner there. Duan Xingzhi offered the Yuan maps of Yunnan and led a considerable army to serve as guides for the Yuan army. By the end of 1256, Yunnan was considered to have been pacified.

Under the Yuan dynasty, the native officials, or tusi, were the clients of a patron-client relationship. The patron, the Yuan emperors, exercised jurisdictional control over the client, but not his/her territory itself.

The tusi chieftains in Yunnan, Guizhou and Sichuan who submitted to Yuan rule and were allowed to keep their titles. The ethnic Han Yang family ruling the Chiefdom of Bozhou which was recognized by the Song and Tang dynasties also received recognition by the subsequent Yuan and Ming dynasties. The Luo clan in Shuixi led by Ahua were recognized by the Yuan emperors, as they were by the Song emperors when led by Pugui and Tang emperors when led by Apei. They descended from the Shu Han era king Huoji who helped Zhuge Liang against Meng Huo. They were also recognized by the Ming dynasty.

Provinces of the Yuan dynasty
Name	Traditional Chinese	Simplified Chinese	Pinyin	Capital		Approximate extent in terms of modern locations
Name	Traditional Chinese	Simplified Chinese	Pinyin	Ancient name	Modern location	Approximate extent in terms of modern locations
Gansu	甘肅	甘肃	Gānsù	Ganzhou	Zhangye	Gansu, Ningxia
Huguang	湖廣	湖广	Huguǎng	Wuchang		Hunan, western Guangdong, Guangxi, Guizhou, Hainan
Henan Jiangbei	河南江北	河南江北	Hénán Jiāngběi	Bianliang	Kaifeng	Henan, northern Hubei, northern Jiangsu, northern Anhui
Jiangxi	江西	江西	Jiāngxī	Longxing	Nanchang	Jiangxi, eastern Guangdong
Jiangzhe	江浙	江浙	Jiāngzhè	Hangzhou		Zhejiang, southern Jiangsu, southern Anhui, Fujian
Liaoyang	遼陽	辽阳	Liáoyáng	Liaoyang		Manchuria, northeastern Korea
Lingbei	嶺北	岭北	Lǐngběi	Helin	Kharkhorin (Karakorum)	Mongolia, northern Inner Mongolia
Shaanxi	陝西	陕西	Shǎnxi	Fengyuan	Xi'an	Shaanxi
Sichuan	四川	四川	Sìchuān	Chengdu		eastern and central Sichuan
Yunnan	雲南	云南	Yúnnán	Zhongqing	Kunming	Yunnan, Upper Burma
Zhengdong	征東	征东	Zhēngdōng	Kaesong		Most of Korea

== Ming dynasty (1368–1644) ==
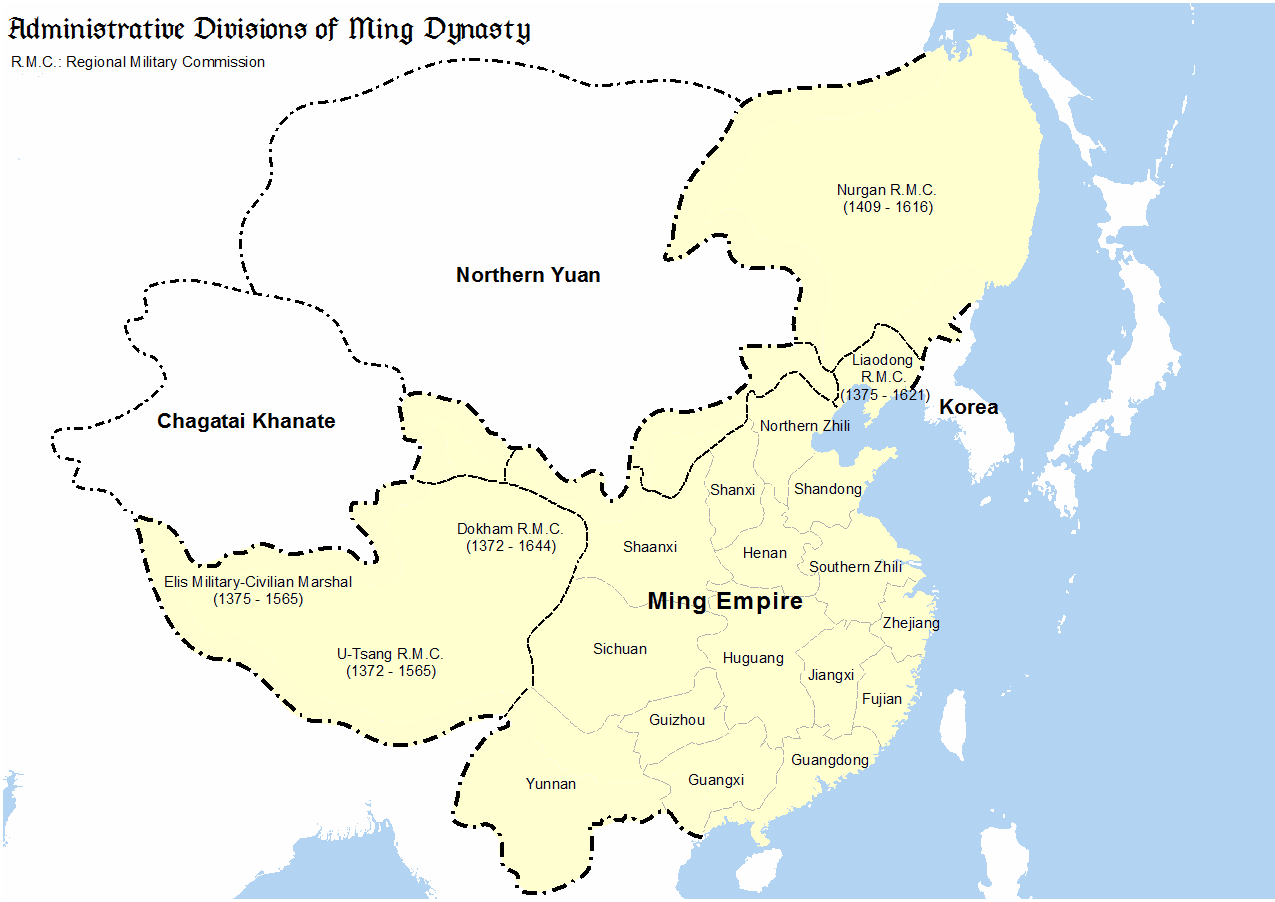
Administrative divisions of Ming dynasty in 1409

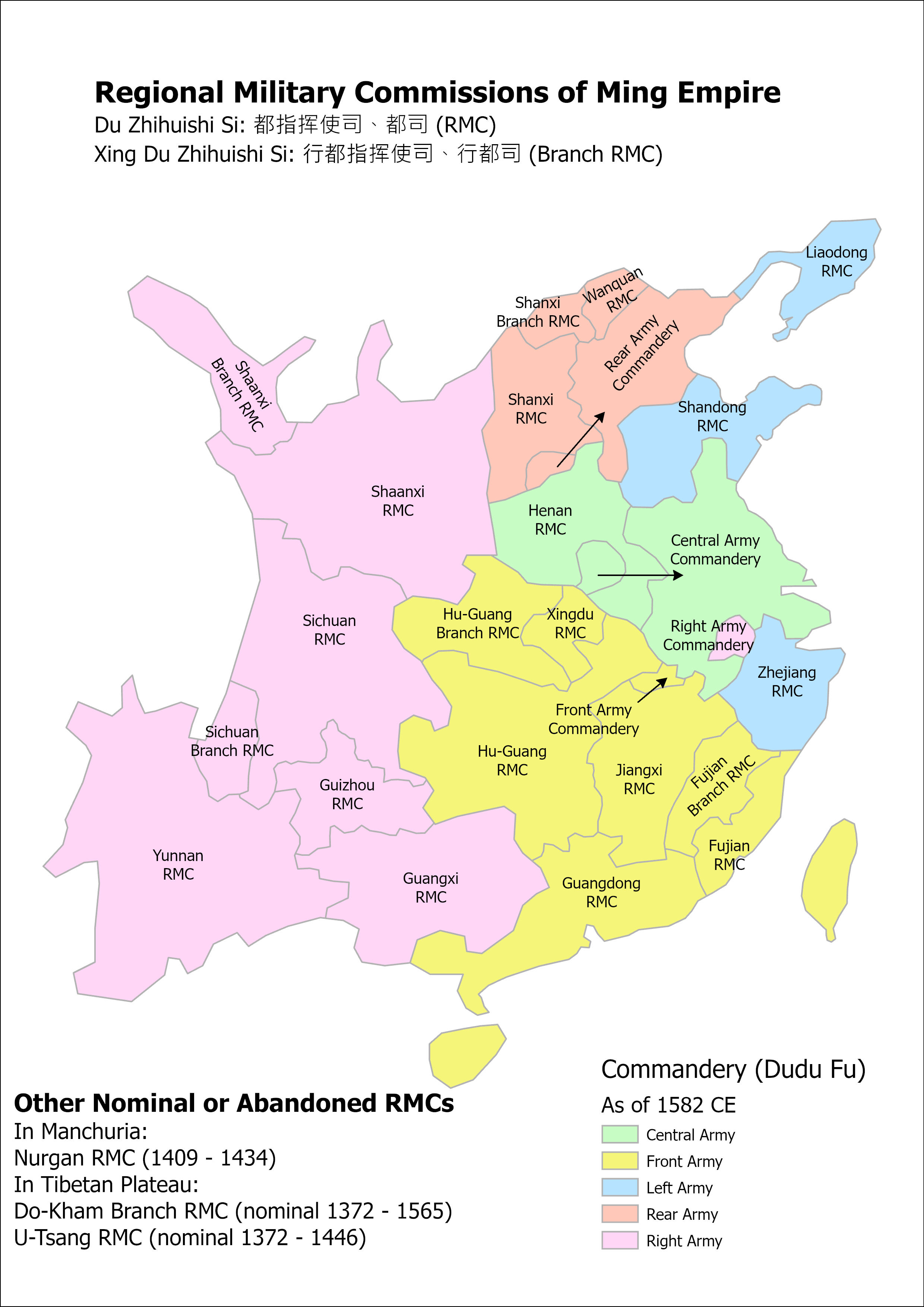
Regional Military Commissions (Du Zhihui Shisi) of Ming dynasty

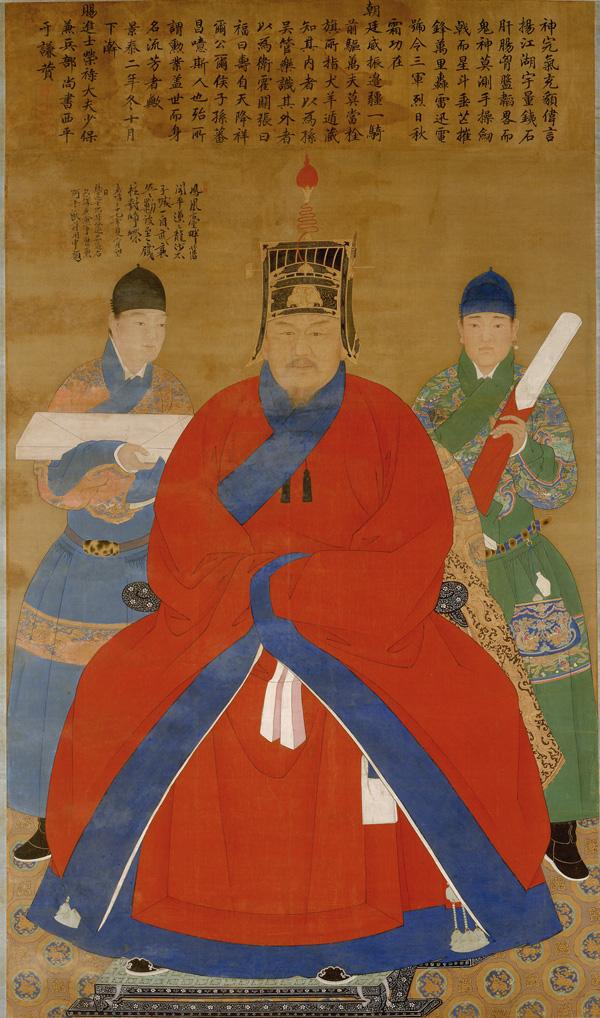
Ming dynasty official, Yang Hong, 1451

The lowest administrative unit during the Ming dynasty was the county which was supervised by a prefecture through a subprefecture. Prefectures were organized into provinces and administered by three cooperating agencies: the Provincial Administration Commission (chengxuan buzheng shisi), the Provincial Surveillance Commission (tixing ancha shisi), and the Regional Military Commission (du zhihui shisi). The three agencies were directed by a Grand Coordinator and Supreme Commander. The post of Grand Coordinator was indefinite and could last as long as 10 or even 20 years. A Supreme Commander handled military affairs. Neither posts were governorships and were considered special-purpose representatives of the government. The Provincial Administration Commission was in general charge of all civil matters, especially fiscal matters. The Provincial Administration kept three to eight branch offices in each province. Each branch office was headed by an Intendant (daotai 道臺) to exercise administrative authority. Each province also had a Tax Intendant (duliang dao 督糧道). The Provincial Surveillance Commission was headed by a single Surveillance Commissioner, under whom were various vice and assistant commissioners who held censorial and judicial powers. Regional Military Commissioners were responsible for military garrisons in the provinces. Executive officials of the Three Provincial Commissions were collectively known as Regional Overseers. The purpose of this tripartite administration of provinces was so that no one had supreme power in one region.

Recruitment by examination flourished after 1384 in the Ming dynasty. Provincial graduates were sometimes appointed to low-ranking offices or entered the Guozijian for further training, after which they might be considered for better appointments. Before appointment to office, metropolitan graduates were assigned to observe the functions of an office for up to one year. The maximum tenure for an office was nine years, but triennial evaluations were also taken, at which point an official could be reassigned. Magistrates of counties submitted monthly evaluation reports to their prefects and the prefects submitted annual evaluations to provincial authorities. Every third year, provincial authorities submitted evaluations to the central government, at which point an "outer evaluation" was conducted, requiring local administration to send representatives to attend a grand audience at the capital. Officials at the capital conducted an evaluation every six years. Capital officials of rank 4 and above were exempted from regular evaluations. Irregular evaluations were conducted by censorial officials.

=== Gaitu guiliu ===
The Ming dynasty continued the Yuan tusi chiefdom system. The Ming tusi were categorized into civil and military ranks. The civilian tusi were given the titles of Tu Zhifu 土知府 ("native prefecture"), Tu Zhizhou 土知州 ("native department") and Tu Zhixian 土知縣 ("native county") according to the size and population of their domains. Nominally, they had the same rank as their counterparts in the regular administration system The central government gave more autonomy to those military tusi who controlled areas with fewer Han Chinese people and had underdeveloped infrastructure. They pledged loyalty to the Ming emperor but had almost unfettered power within their domains.

All the native chieftains were nominally subordinate to Pacification Commissioners (Xuanfushi, Xuanweishi, Anfushi 宣撫使, 宣慰使, 安撫使). The Pacification Commissioners were also native chieftains who received their title from the Ming court. As a way of checking their power, Pacification Commissioners were put under the supervision of the Ministry of War.

Throughout its 276-year history, the Ming dynasty bestowed a total of 1608 tusi titles, 960 of which were military-rank and 648 were civilian-rank, the majority of which were in Yunnan, Guizhou and Sichuan. In Tibet, Qinghai and Sichuan, the Ming court sometimes gave both tusi titles and religious titles to leaders. As a result, those tusi had double identities. They played both the role of political leaders and religious leaders within their domains. For example, during the reign of the Yongle Emperor, the leader of the Jinchuan monastery assisted the Ming army in a battle against the Mongols. The leader was later given the title Yanhua Chanshi (演化禅师), or "Evolved Chan Master", and the power to rule 15 villages as his domain as a reward.

Under Ming administration, the jurisdictional authority of tusi began to be replaced with state territorial authority. The tusi acted as stop gaps until enough Chinese settlers arrived for a "tipping point" to be reached, and they were then converted into official prefectures and counties to be fully annexed into the central bureaucratic system of the Ming dynasty. This process was known as gaitu guiliu (simplified Chinese: 改土归流; traditional Chinese: 改土歸流), or "turning native rule into regular administration". The most notable example of this was the consolidation of southwestern tusi chiefdoms into the province of Guizhou in 1413.

Building upon the Yuan precedent, the Ming began its colonization of the southwest in the 1370s, and though its military strength waxed and waned, it was able to eliminate the largest autonomous kingdoms in the southwest by the early decades of the seventeenth century. By the time of the Ming-Qing transition, what remained in the southwest were only a few small autonomous polities, and the Rebellion of the Three Feudatories (sanfan zhi luan; 1673–81) did much to erase these from the landscape. In short, the Yongzheng Emperor's appointment of his trusted Manchu official Ortai (1680–1745) and the aggressive campaign against tusi offices they initiated in the 1720s in the southwest should be seen as the end point, not the beginning, of China's colonization of the southwest.

— John E. Herman

In sum, gaitu guiliu was the process of replacing tusi with state-appointed officials, the transition from jurisdictional sovereignty to territorial sovereignty, and the start of formal empire rather than informal.

Provinces of the Ming dynasty
Name	Traditional Chinese	Simplified Chinese	Pinyin	Abbreviation	Capital	Traditional Chinese	Simplified Chinese	Modern divisions
Beizhili	北直隸	北直隶	Běizhílì	燕 yān	Shuntian (Beijing)	順天府(北京)	顺天府（北京）	Beijing, Hebei, Tianjin
Nanzhili	南直隸	南直隶	Nánzhílì	吳 wú	Yingtian (Nanjing)	應天府(南京)	应天府（南京）	Anhui, Jiangsu, Shanghai
Fujian	福建	福建	Fújiàn	閩 mǐn	Fuzhou (Fuzhou)	福州府	福州府	
Guangdong	廣東	广东	Guǎngdōng	粵 yuè	Guangzhou (Guangzhou)	廣州府	广州府	Guangdong, Hainan
Guangxi	廣西	广西	Guǎngxī	桂 guì	Guilin (Guilin)	桂林府	桂林府	
Guizhou	貴州	贵州	Guìzhōu	黔 qián	Guiyang (Guiyang)	貴陽府	贵阳府	
Henan	河南	河南	Hénán	豫 yù	Kaifeng (Kaifeng)	開封府	开封府	
Huguang	湖廣	湖广	Húguǎng	楚 chǔ	Wuchang (Wuhan)	武昌府(武漢)	武昌府（武汉）	Hubei, Hunan
Jiangxi	江西	江西	Jiāngxī	贛 gàn	Nanchang (Nanchang)	南昌府	南昌府	
Shaanxi	陝西	陕西	Shǎnxī	秦 qín	Xi'an (Xi'an)	西安府	西安府	Gansu, Ningxia, Shaanxi
Shandong	山東	山东	Shāndōng	魯 lǔ	Jinan (Jinan)	濟南府	济南府	
Shanxi	山西	山西	Shānxī	晉 jìn	Taiyuan (Taiyuan)	太原府	太原府	
Sichuan	四川	四川	Sìchuān	蜀 shǔ	Chengdu (Chengdu)	成都府	成都府	Chongqing, Sichuan
Yunnan	雲南	云南	Yúnnán	滇 diān	Yunnan (Kunming)	雲南府(昆明)	云南府（昆明）	
Zhejiang	浙江	浙江	Zhèjiāng	浙 zhè	Hangzhou (Hangzhou)	杭州府	杭州府	
Jiaozhi	交趾	交趾	Jiāozhǐ	交 jiāo	Jiaozhou (Hanoi)	交州府 (河內)	交州府（河內）	

== Qing dynasty (1644–1912) ==
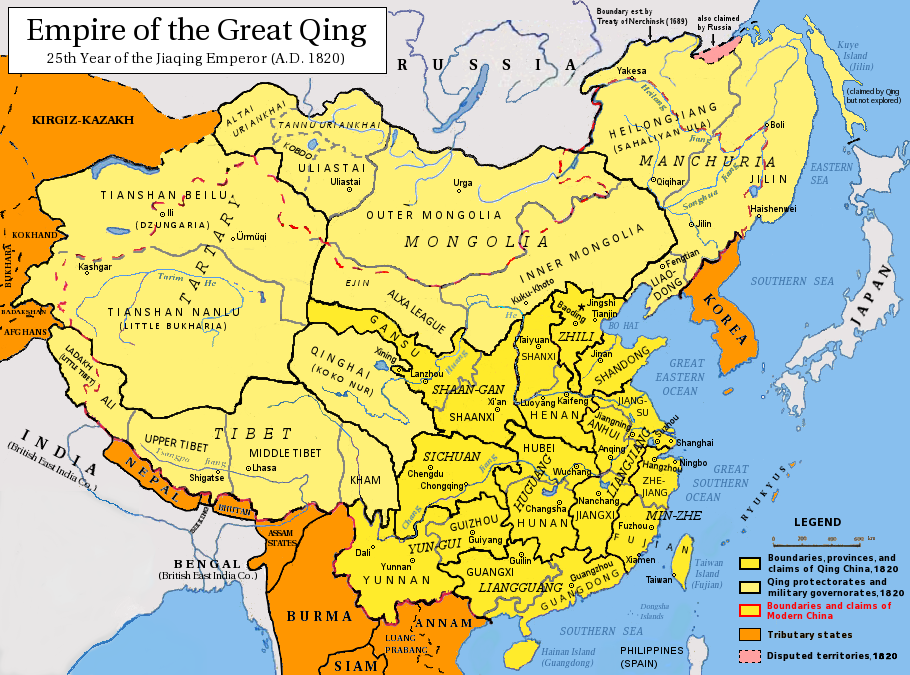
The Qing dynasty and its provinces, near its greatest extent. (1820)

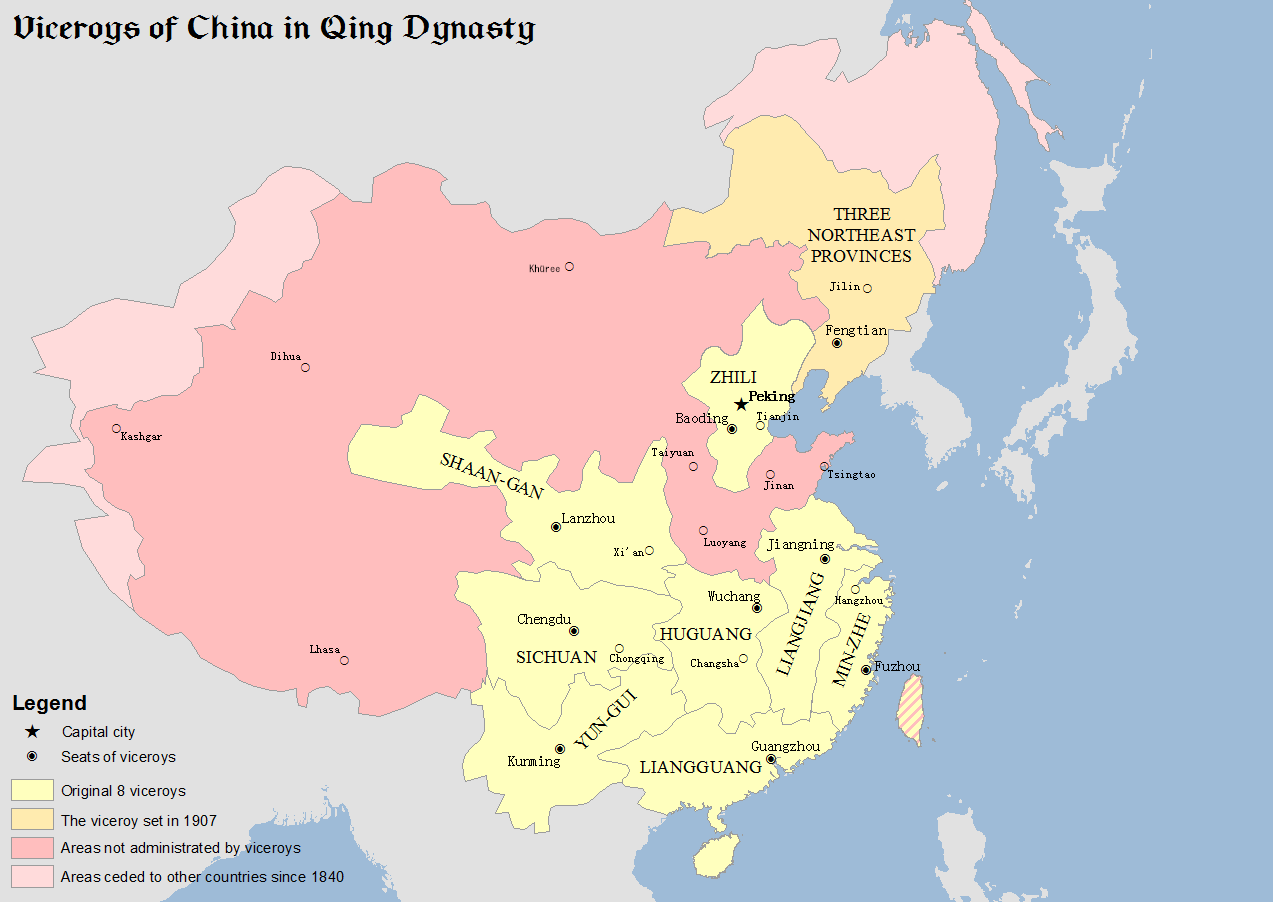
Governorships of the Qing dynasty

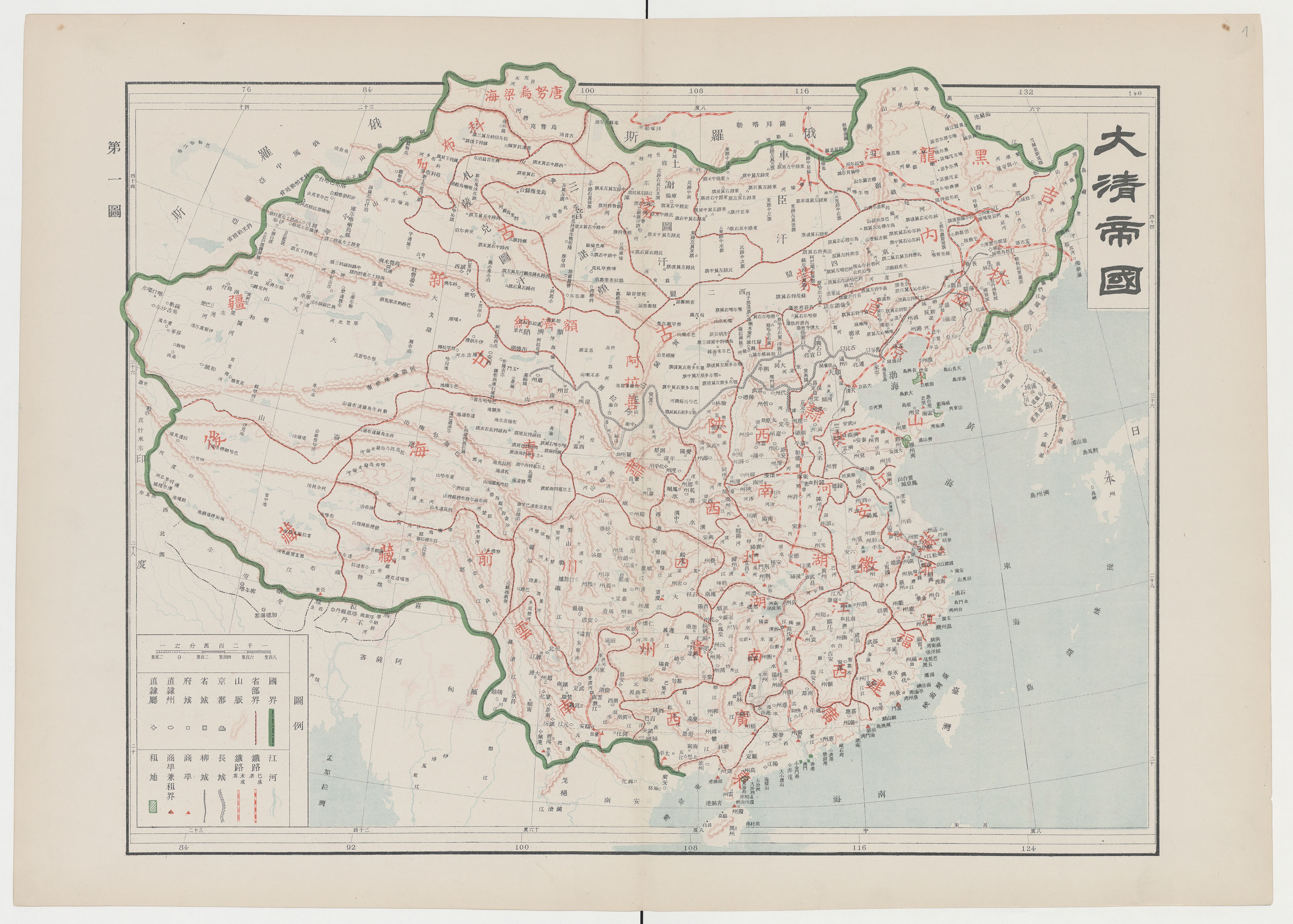
Official map of the Qing Empire published in 1905.

The Qing dynasty kept the Ming province system and expanded it to 18 provinces by 1850. However unlike the Ming tripartite provincial administration, Qing provinces were governed by a single Governor (xunfu) who held substantial power. Although all provincial agencies communicated with the central government through him, he himself was subordinate to a Governors-general (zongdu). While nominally superior to a Governor, usually the Governors-general cooperated closely with the Governor and acted jointly in reporting to the central government. Governors and Governors-general did not have to have a Manchu-Han Chinese balance, unlike in the central government.

Subordinate to Governors were two kinds of agencies: Provincial Administration Commissions (chengxuan buzheng shisi) and Provincial Surveillance Commissions (tixing ancha shisi). The Provincial Administration Commissioner was a lieutenant-general who bore fiscal responsibilities. The Provincial Surveillance Commissioner was responsible for the administration of judicial and censorial matters. There was also an unofficial Provincial Education Commissioner (tidu xuezheng 提督學政) in every province who supervised schools and certified candidates for the civil service examinations. Under the provincial administration were Circuit Intendants (daotai) who served as intermediaries between prefectures and provincial administration.

Provinces of the Qing dynasty (1911)
Name	Traditional Chinese	Simplified Chinese	Pinyin	Abbreviation	Capital	Traditional Chinese	Simplified Chinese
China proper
Anhui	安徽	安徽	Ānhuī	皖 wǎn	Anqing	安慶	安庆
Zhejiang	浙江	浙江	Zhèjiāng	浙 zhè	Hangzhou	杭州	杭州
Zhili	直隸	直隶	Zhílì	直 zhí	Baoding	保定	保定
Fujian	福建	福建	Fújiàn	閩 mǐn	Fuzhou	福州	福州
Henan	河南	河南	Hénán	豫 yù	Kaifeng	開封	开封
Hubei	湖北	湖北	Húběi	鄂 è	Wuchang	武昌	武昌
Hunan	湖南	湖南	Húnán	湘 xiāng	Changsha	長沙	长沙
Gansu	甘肅	甘肃	Gānsù	甘 gān or 隴 lǒng	Lanzhou	蘭州	兰州
Jiangsu	江蘇	江苏	Jiāngsū	蘇 sū	Jiangning (Nanjing); Suzhou	江寧(南京) 蘇州	江宁(南京) 苏州
Jiangxi	江西	江西	Jiāngxī	贛 gàn	Nanchang	南昌	南昌
Guangdong (Canton)	廣東	广东	Guǎngdōng	粵 yuè	Guangzhou (Canton)	廣州	广州
Guangxi	廣西	广西	Guǎngxī	桂 guì	Guilin	桂林	桂林
Guizhou	貴州	贵州	Guìzhōu	黔 qián or 貴 guì	Guiyang	貴陽	贵阳
Shanxi	山西	山西	Shānxī	晉 jìn	Taiyuan	太原	太原
Shandong	山東	山东	Shāndōng	魯 lǔ	Jinan	濟南	济南
Shaanxi	陝西	陝西	Shǎnxī	陝 shǎn or 秦 qín	Xi'an	西安	西安
Sichuan	四川	四川	Sìchuān	川 chuān or 蜀 shǔ	Chengdu	成都	成都
Yunnan	雲南	云南	Yúnnán	滇 diān or 雲 yún	Kunming	雲南(昆明)	云南(昆明)
Manchuria (incorporated into the provincial system in 1907)
Fengtian (now Liaoning)	奉天	奉天	Fèngtiān	奉 fèng	Mukden (now Shenyang)	盛京(瀋陽)	盛京(沈阳)
Heilongjiang	黑龍江	黑龙江	Hēilóngjiāng	黑 hēi	Qiqihar	齊齊哈爾	齐齐哈尔
Jilin	吉林	吉林	Jílín	吉 jí	Jilin	吉林	吉林
Xinjiang (incorporated into the provincial system in 1884)
Xinjiang	新疆	新疆	Xīnjiāng	新 xīn or 疆 jiāng	Dihua (Ürümqi)	迪化(烏魯木齊)	迪化(乌鲁木齐)

=== Lifan Yuan ===
Peripheral territories such as Mongolia, Xinjiang, and Tibet were supervised by the Lifan Yuan (Court of Colonial Affairs). The people living in these areas were generally able to keep their own way of life so long as they kept the peace and showed deference to the Qing emperor. Many of the Mongols were organized into Manchu-style banners or leagues and it was not until the 19th century that Mongolia was brought under tighter control under a Manchu general or Grand Minister Consultant (canzan dachen 參贊大臣) and several Judicial Administrators (banshi siyuan 辦事司員). The people of Xinjiang were treated as tributary vassals and their leaders used Chinese titles. Tibet's religious leaders were relatively autonomous and treated as tributary princes until the 1720s when rebelliousness prompted the Qing government to place the area under the administration of two Grand Minister Residents (zhuzang dachen 駐藏大臣), who were supported by Qing military garrisons.

Feudatory Regions of the Qing dynasty
Period Name (Current Name)	Traditional Chinese	Simplified Chinese	Pinyin	Abbreviation	Capital	Traditional Chinese	Simplified Chinese
Tibet (Tibet)	西藏	西藏	Xīzàng	藏 zàng	Lhasa	喇薩(拉薩)	喇萨(拉萨)
Qinghai	青海	青海	Qīnghǎi	青 qīng	Xining	西寧	西宁
Uliastai (Outer Mongolia)	烏里雅蘇臺(外蒙古)	乌里雅苏台(外蒙古)	Wūlǐyǎsūtái (Ménggǔ)	—	Uliastai	烏里雅蘇臺	乌里雅苏台
Secen Khan aimag (Sechen Khan)	車臣汗部	车臣汗部	Chēchénhánbù	—	Ikh Khüree (Ulaanbaatar)	大庫倫(烏蘭巴托)	大库伦(乌兰巴托)
Tüsheetu Khan aimag (Tüsheet Khan)	土謝圖汗部	土谢图汗部	Tǔxiètúhánbù	—	Ikh Khüree (Ulaanbaatar)	大庫倫(烏蘭巴托)	大库伦(乌兰巴托)
Zasagt Khan aimag (Zasagt Khan)	札薩克圖汗部	札薩克圖汗部	Zhásàkètúhànbù	—	Uliastai	烏里雅蘇臺	乌里雅苏台
Sain Noyon aimag (Sain Noyon Khan)	賽音諾顏部	賽音諾顏部	Sàiyīnnuòyánbù	—	Uliastai	烏里雅蘇臺	乌里雅苏台
Kobdo (Khovd)	科布多	科布多	Kēbùduō	—	Kobdo (Khovd)	科布多城	科布多城
Tannu Uriankhai	唐努烏梁海	唐努乌梁海	Tángnǔwūliánghǎi	—			
Altay (Altay)	阿爾泰	阿尔泰	Āĕrtài	—	Chenghua Temple (Altay)	承化寺(阿勒泰)	承化寺(阿勒泰)
Inner Mongolia	內蒙古	内蒙古	Nèi Měnggǔ	None (The divisions below are direct administered by Lifan Yuan)			
Jirim aimag(Tongliao)	哲里木盟(通遼)	哲里木盟(通辽)	Zhélǐmù	—	?	?	?
Josutu aimag(part of Chifeng)	卓索圖盟	卓索图盟	Zhuósuǒtú	—	?	?	?
Yekejuu aimag(Ordos)	伊克昭盟(鄂尔多斯)	伊克昭盟(鄂尔多斯)	Yīkèzhāo	—	?	?	?
Juuuda aimag(Chifeng)	昭烏達盟(赤峰)	昭乌达盟(赤峰)	Zhāowūdá	—	?	?	?
Xilingol aimag	錫林郭勒盟	锡林郭勒盟	Xīlínguōlè	—	Beizi Temple (Xilinhot)	貝子廟(錫林浩特)	贝子庙(锡林浩特)
Ulanqab aimag	烏蘭察布盟	乌兰察布盟	Wūlánchábù	—	?	?	?
Chahar (part of Xilingol)	八旗察哈爾	八旗察哈尔	Cháhā'ěr	—	Kalgan (Zhangjiakou)	喀拉幹(張家口)	喀拉干(张家口)
West Hetao Mongolia	西套蒙古	西套蒙古	Xītào Měnggǔ	None (The divisions below are direct administered by Lifan Yuan)			
Alxa	阿拉善厄魯特旗	阿拉善厄鲁特旗	Ālāshàn'èlŭtè	—	(Bayanhot)	定遠營(巴彥浩特)	定远营(巴彦浩特)
Ejin (Ejin Banner)	額濟納土爾扈特旗	额济纳土尔扈特旗	Éjìnàtŭĕrhùtè	—	?	?	?

== See also ==
- Dynasties of China
- Tributary system of China
- Chinese expansionism
