= Xiqin =

Xiqin may refer to:

- Xiqin (instrument), a bowed string Chinese musical instrument
- Western Qin (385-400, 409-431), a Xianbei state and one of the Sixteen Kingdoms
- Xiqin Guildhall, a museum in Zigong, Sichuan, China

== Towns or townships in China ==
- Xiqin, Fujian (西芹), a town in Nanping, Fujian
- Xiqin Manchu Ethnic Township (希勤满族乡), a township in Harbin, Heilongjiang
- Xiqên Township or Xiqin Township (锡钦乡), a township in Lhatse County, Tibet
