= Shaanxi (Yuan province) =

Province (1260s-1370s) of the Yuan Empire, periodically combined with Sichuan

Shaanxi Province 陕西行省
- Province of the Yuan dynasty
- 1260–1368
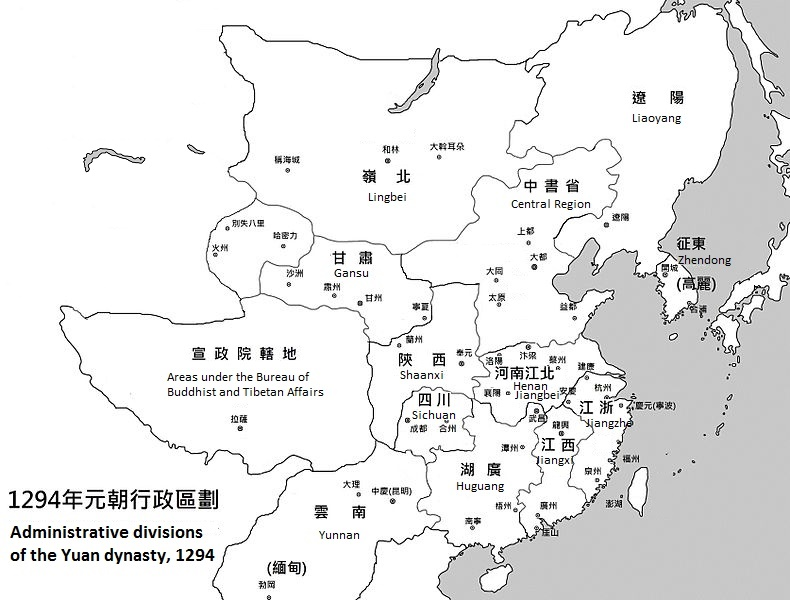
- Capital: Xi'an
  - Type: Yuan hierarchy
- History
  - Established: 1260
  - Disestablished: 1368
Preceded by	Succeeded by
Mongol Empire	Northern Yuan dynasty

Shaanxi Province was a province of the Yuan dynasty governed from Xi'an, known during that period as Fengyuan (奉元), Anxi (安西, "Peaceful West"), and Jingzhao (京兆). It was established in 1260. In 1294, Sichuan was split off from Shaanxi.

Yuan-era Shaanxi included the majority of present-day Shaanxi, the southwestern part of Inner Mongolia, southeastern Gansu (around Qingyuan), north-western Sichuan, and a small part of Qinghai.

During the Northern Song dynasty, it was mostly part of the Yongxing Jun, capital also at Xi'an. Following the Jin-Song Wars, the Jurchen-led Jin dynasty established rule over the northern part of the area, establishing Jingzhao Fu, Qingyuan, and Xiqin.

In 2015, a Yuan-era tomb fresco was excavated in Luogetai village, Gao town, Hengshan district, Yulin city in Shaanxi province.
