= Guangnan Circuit =

Historical division of China

- Traditional Chinese: 廣南路
- Simplified Chinese: 广南路
Transcriptions
Standard Mandarin
- Hanyu Pinyin: Guǎngnán Lù

Guangnan Circuit or Guangnan Province was a short-lived circuit during the early Song dynasty, corresponding to the former Southern Han territory after Southern Han was annexed by Song in 971. In 988, Guangnan Circuit was divided into Guangnan East Circuit and Guangnan West Circuit.
