= Jiangzhe (Yuan province) =

Province of the Yuan dynasty

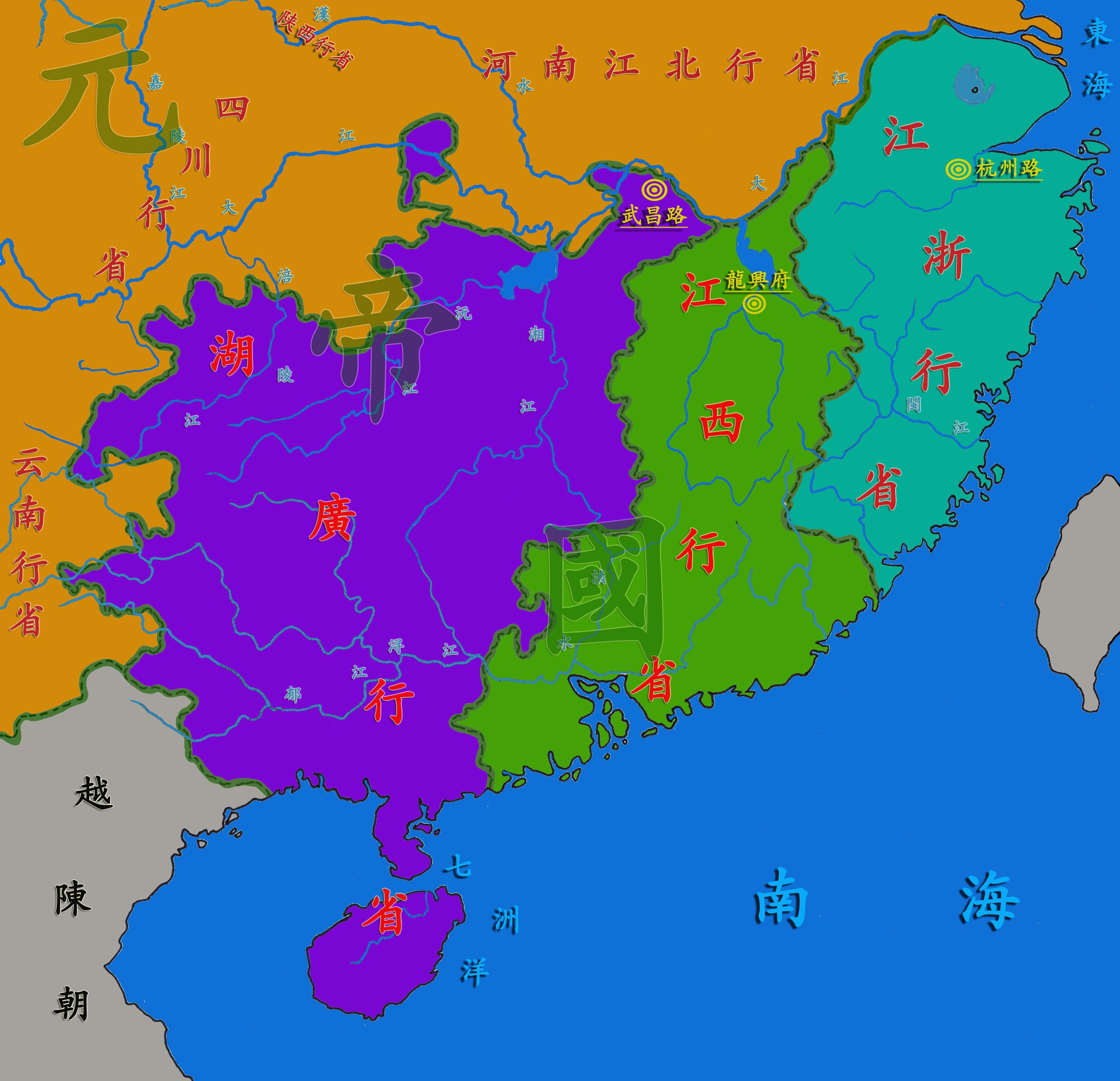
Jiangzhe in blue

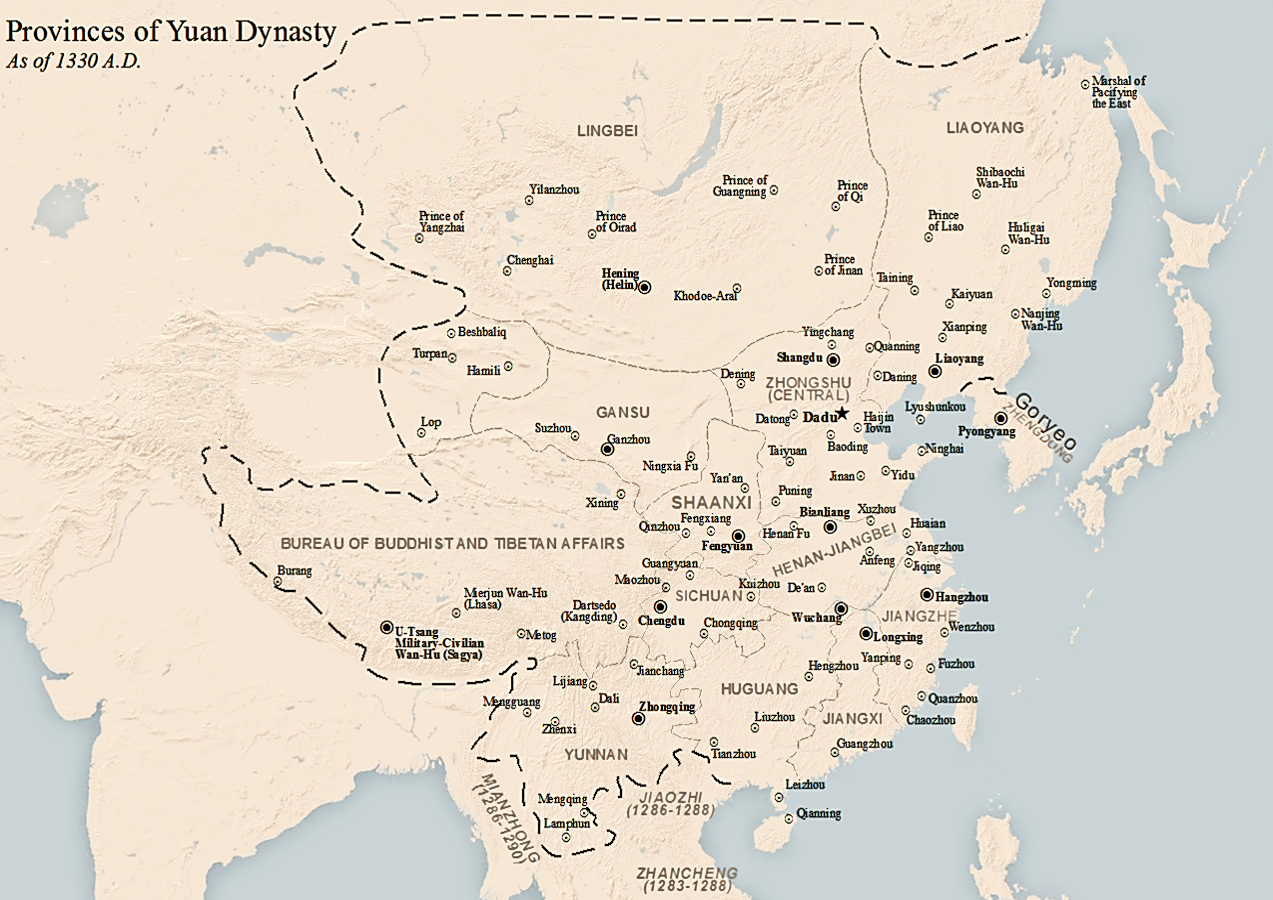
Yuan provinces in 1330

Jiangzhe province (江浙行省) or Chiangche was a province of the Yuan dynasty established in 1276. It included the southern portion of Jiangsu south of the Yangtze River, Zhejiang, Fujian, and part of northern Guangdong. With capital was initially at Yangzhou, but in 1297 it was moved to Hangzhou Lu.

The former Song dynasty circuits which were incorporated into Jiangzhe included Liangzhe East Circuit, Liangzhe West Circuit, Fujian Circuit, and Guangnan East Circuit.

After the establishment of the Ming dynasty, Jiangzhe province was split into Zhejiang and Fujian, with part of the province also being combined into Guangdong.

== See also ==
- Yang Province
- Wuyue
- Liangzhe Circuit
- Viceroy of Liangjiang
- Jiangnan Province
