= Huguang (province) =

Province of China during the Yuan and Ming dynasties

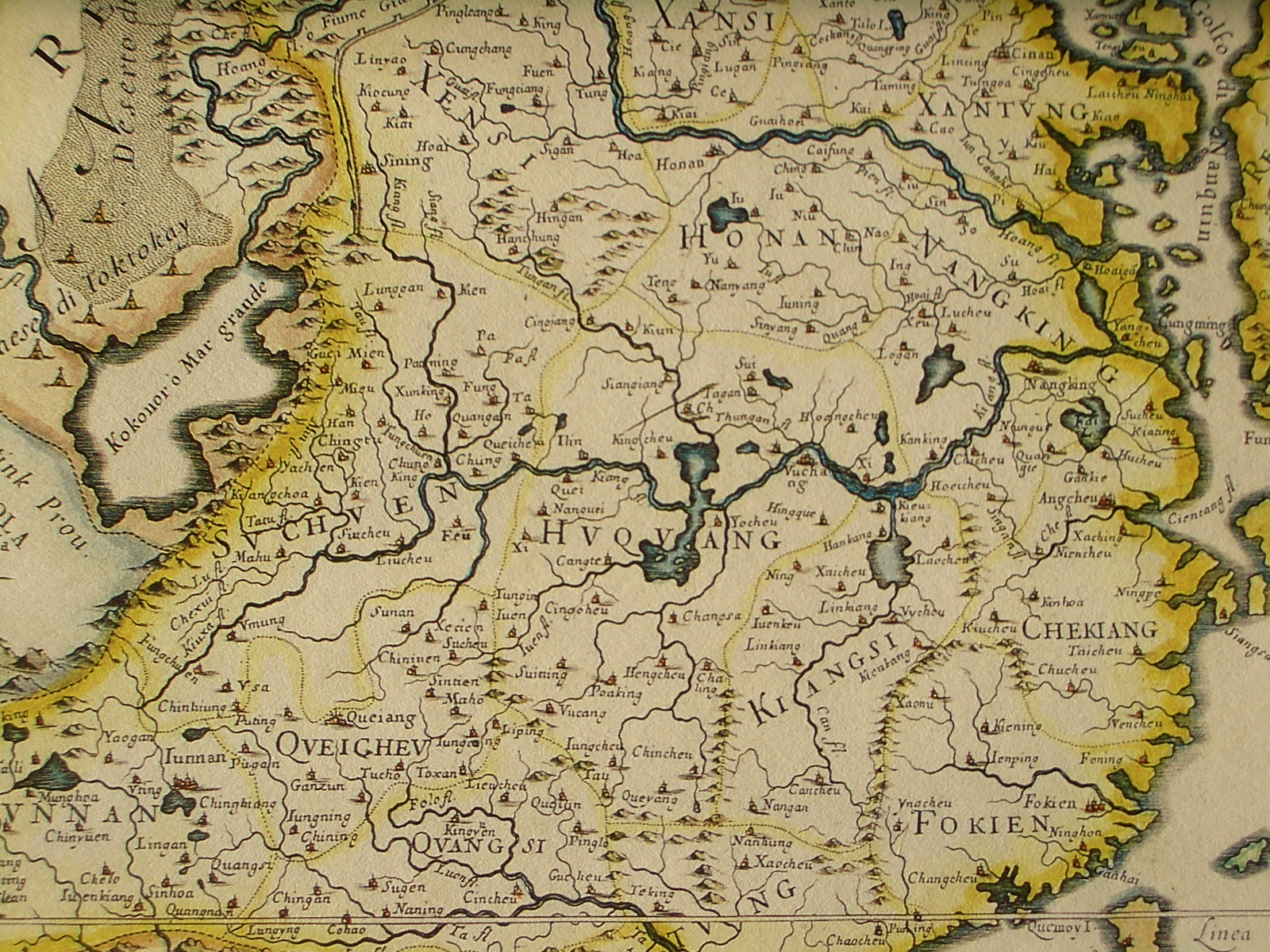
- Huguang in a 1682 Italian map of China
- Traditional Chinese: 湖廣
- Simplified Chinese: 湖广
- Literal meaning: The Lake Expanse; The Broad Lake Provinces
Transcriptions
Standard Mandarin
- Hanyu Pinyin: Húguǎng

Huguang (Note: Also formerly romanized as Hoo-kwang.) was a province of China during the Yuan and Ming dynasties. It was founded by the Yuan dynasty in 1274. During the Yuan dynasty it included the areas of modern Hubei south of the Yangtze river, Hunan, Guizhou, and Guangxi. During the Ming dynasty it came to include just the modern provinces of Hubei and Hunan, in the process adding areas north of the Yangtze. It was partitioned in 1644 by the newly established Qing dynasty, becoming the provinces of Hubei and Hunan, which were administered by the viceroy of Huguang.

== Governors ==
Li Hongzhang was the viceroy of Huguang from 1867 to 1870.

Zhang Zhidong became the viceroy of Huguang in 1896, following the First Sino-Japanese War. He was notable for employing foreigners to train and equip the local military to the standards of a contemporary European army. The most elite of Zhang's forces were known as the "Wuchang Division".

Following its partition, the separate provinces were administered by governors, while Lianghu or Huguang was collectively overseen by a viceroy.

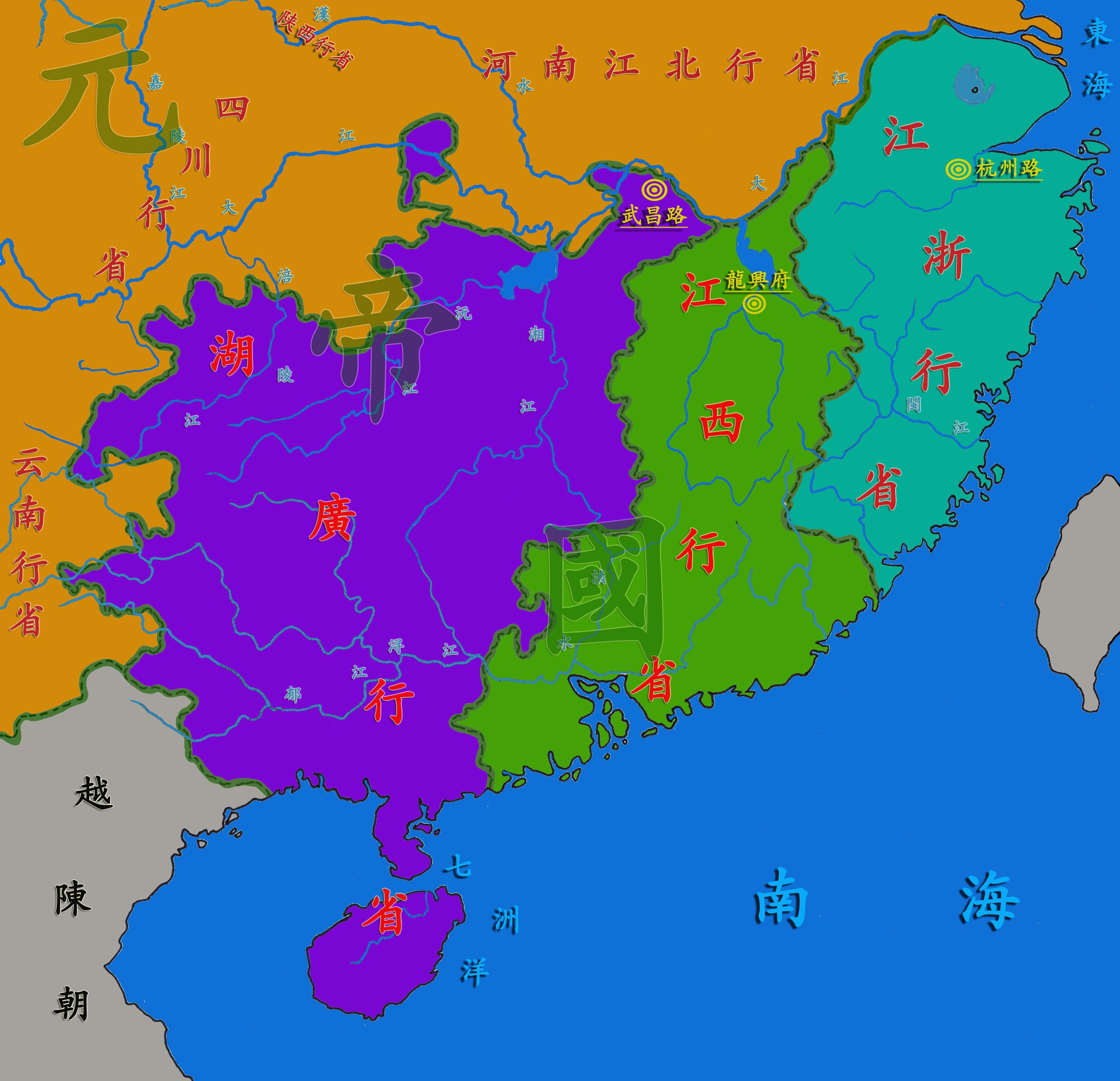
Yuan dynasty Huguang province (in purple

== See also ==
- Administrative divisions of the Yuan dynasty
- Jingzhou (ancient China)
- China proper
