= Guangnan West Circuit =

Former imperial circuit of Song China

- Traditional Chinese: 廣南西路
- Hanyu Pinyin: Guǎngnán Xī Lù
- Jyutping: gwong2 naam4 sai1 lou6
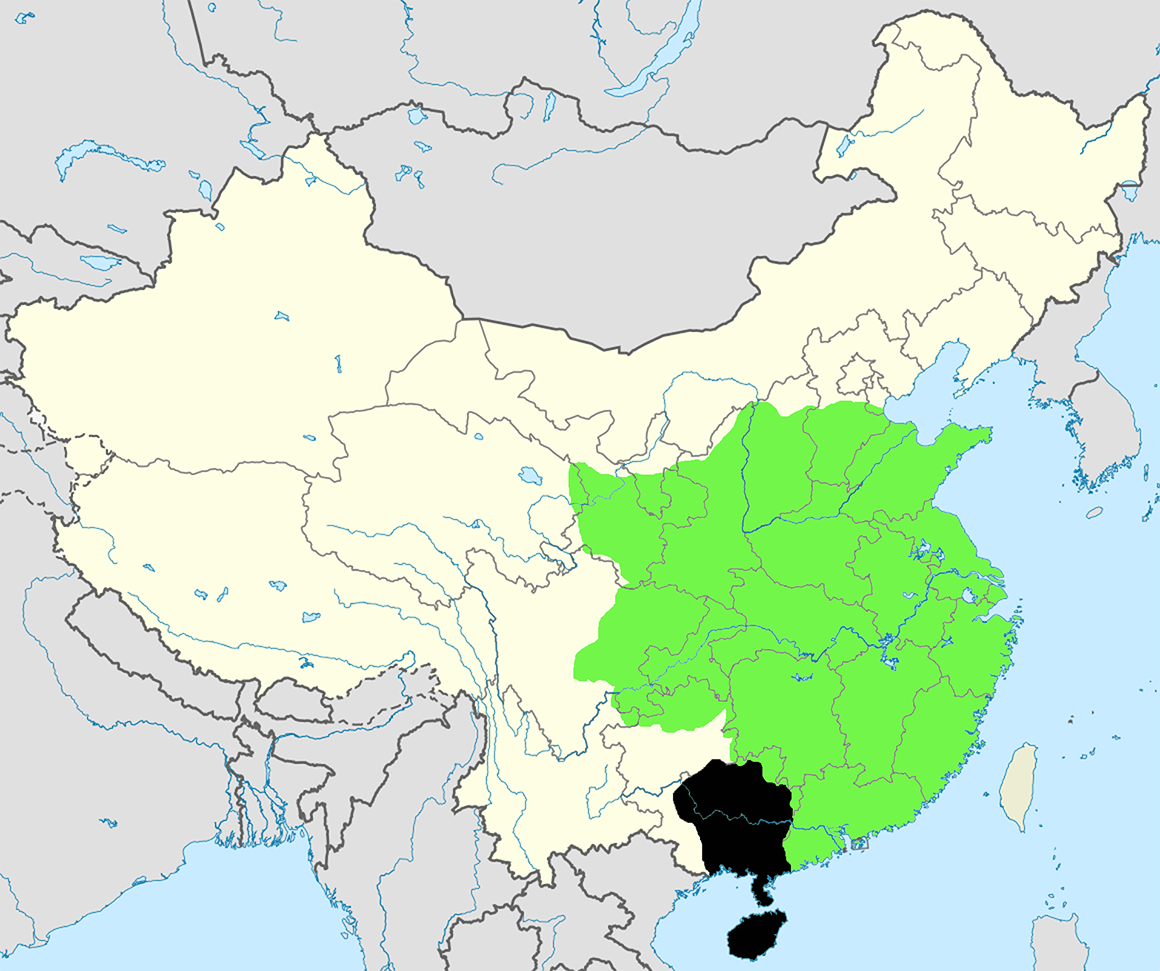
- Guangnan West Circuit within Song dynasty territory, c. 1100
- Population
  - 1162: 1,341,572
- History
  - Preceded by: Guangnan Circuit
  - Created: 988 (Song dynasty)
  - Abolished: 1278 (Yuan dynasty)
  - HQ: Gui Prefecture

Guangnan West Circuit or Guangnan West Province was one of the major circuits during the Song dynasty. Its administrative area corresponds to roughly the modern provinces of Guangxi and Hainan, as well as the western part of Guangdong (Leizhou Peninsula).

Guangnan West Circuit and Guangnan East Circuit were split from Guangnan Circuit in 988.

After the Yuan dynasty was established, most of the Guangnan West Circuit became part of the much larger Huguang province, whose capital was at Wuchang.

== See also ==
- History of Guangxi
- Lingnan culture
