= Sichuan (Yuan province) =

Province of the Yuan Empire, established 1294

Sichuan province 四川行省
- Province of the Yuan dynasty
- 1294–1368
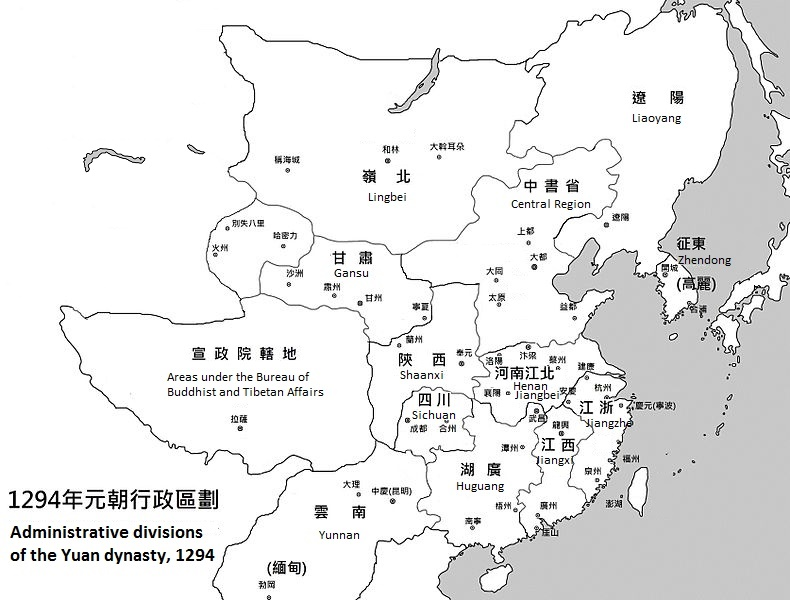
- Capital: Chengdu
  - Type: Yuan hierarchy
- History
  - Established: 1294
  - Disestablished: 1368
  - Ming campaign against the Uriankhai: 1387
Preceded by	Succeeded by
Mongol Empire	Northern Yuan dynasty

Sichuan Province was a province of the Yuan dynasty. It was established in 1294, after being split off from Shaanxi Province.

The area had previously been part of the Northern Song dynasty circuits Chengdufu, Zizhou, and Kuizhou.

The province was significantly smaller than today's Sichuan, although it includes portions of Chongqing Municipality, which would not be split off until 1997.
