= Henan Jiangbei (Yuan province) =

Province of the Yuan dynasty

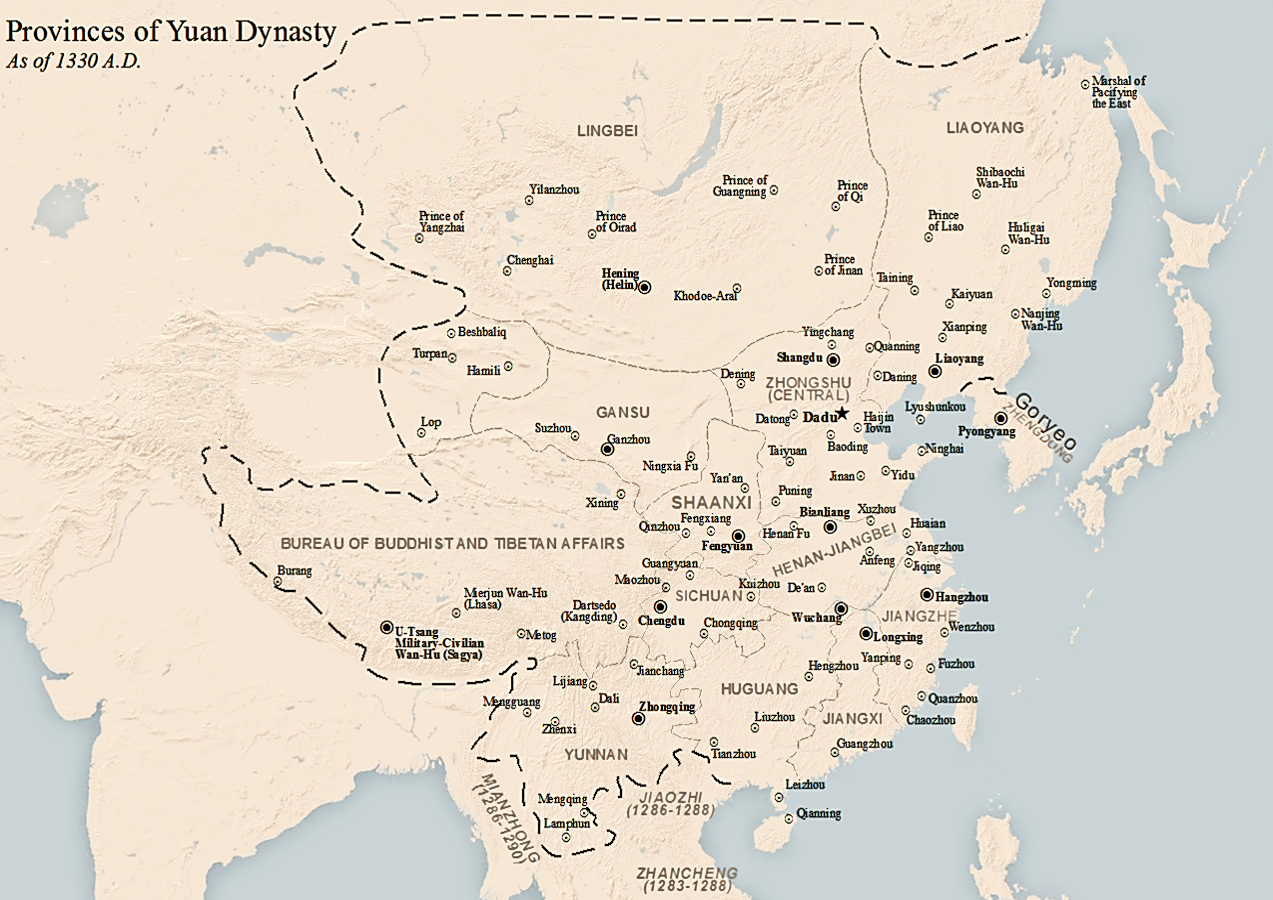
Yuan provinces in 1330

Henan Jiangbei province (Chinese: 河南江北行省), also referred to as just Henan, was a province (Branch Secretariat) of the Yuan dynasty of China established in 1268. It included the modern Henan, northern Jiangsu, and part of Anhui. The capital was Bianliang (Kaifeng).

== See also ==
- Administrative divisions of the Yuan dynasty
- Yang Province
- Viceroy of Liangjiang
- Jiangnan Province
