= Jiangxi (Yuan province) =

Province of the Yuan dynasty established in 1277

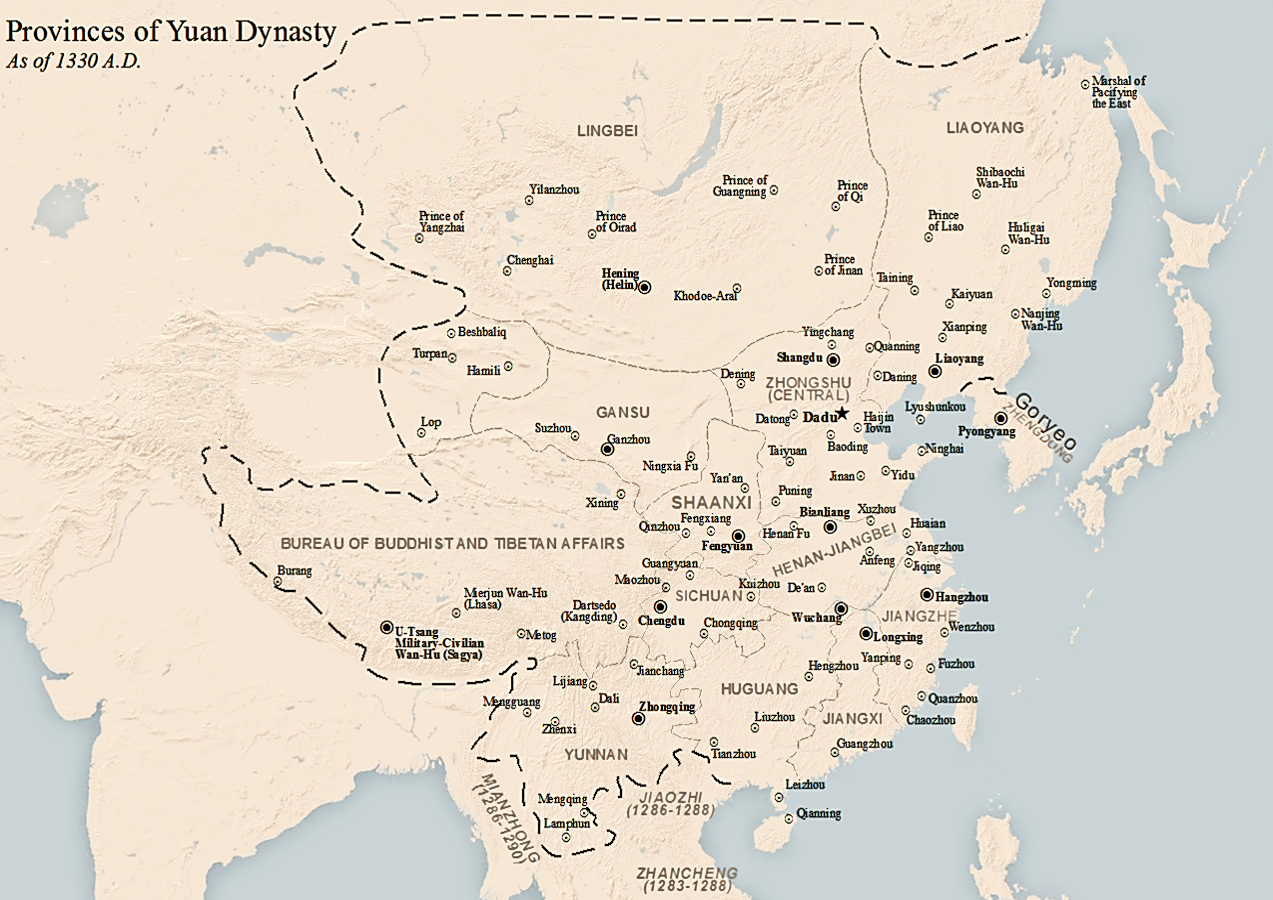
Yuan provinces in 1330

Jiangxi province was a province of the Yuan dynasty established in 1277. It included modern Jiangxi, and most of Guangdong. The capital was Longxing (now called Nanchang).

== See also ==
- Administrative divisions of the Yuan dynasty
