= Guangnan East Circuit =

Former imperial circuit of Song China

- Traditional Chinese: 廣南東路
- Hanyu Pinyin: Guǎngnán Dōng Lù
- Jyutping: gwong2 naam4 dung1 lou6
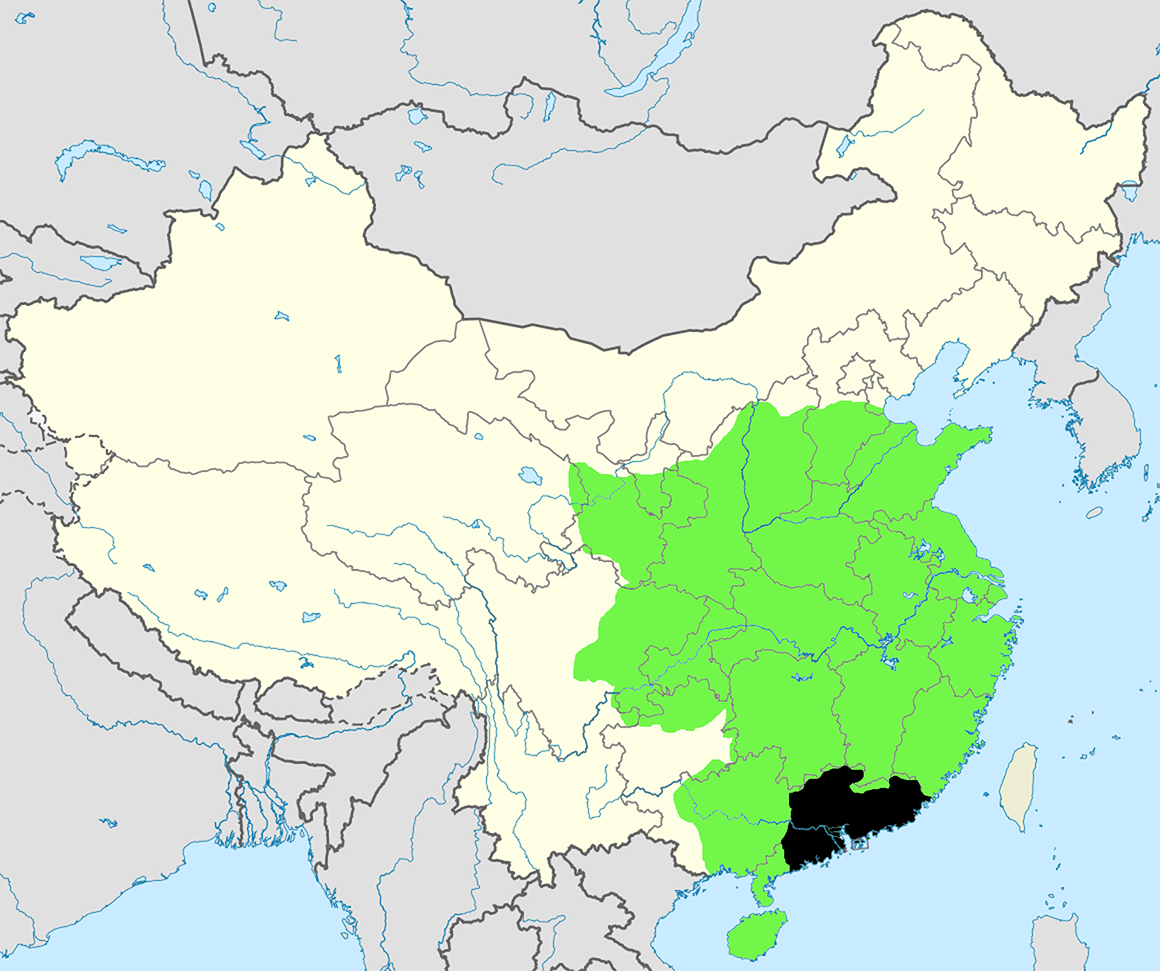
- Guangnan East Circuit within Song dynasty territory, c. 1100
- Population
  - 1162: 784,774
- History
  - Preceded by: Guangnan Circuit
  - Created: 988 (Song dynasty)
  - Abolished: 1278 (Yuan dynasty)
  - HQ: Guǎng Prefecture

Guangnan East Circuit or Guangnan East Province was one of the major circuits during the Song dynasty. Its administrative area corresponds to roughly the modern Chinese province of Guangdong (minus Leizhou Peninsula) and the special administrative regions of Hong Kong and Macau.

Guangnan East Circuit and Guangnan West Circuit were split from Guangnan Circuit in 988.

== See also ==
- Lingnan culture
- Guangdong § History
