= Xiqin Manchu Ethnic Township =

Xiqin Manchu Ethnic Township 希勤满族乡 ᡧᡳᠴᡳᠨ ᠮᠠᠨᠵᡠ ᡠᡴᠰᡠᡵᠠᡳ ᡤᠠᡧᠠᠨ
- Ethnic township
- Location in Heilongjiang
- Coordinates: 45°17′30″N 126°2′57″E
- Country: People's Republic of China
- Province: Heilongjiang
- Prefecture-level city: Harbin
- District: Shuangcheng District
- Time zone: China Standard

Xiqin Manchu Ethnic Township (simplified Chinese: 希勤满族乡; traditional Chinese: 希勤滿族鄉; pinyin: Xīqín Mǎn Zú Xiāng), (Manchu: ᡧᡳᠴᡳᠨ
ᠮᠠᠨᠵᡠ
ᡠᡴᠰᡠᡵᠠᡳ
ᡤᠠᡧᠠᠨ, Möllendorff romanization: šicin manju uksurai gašan) is an ethnic township for Manchu people under the administration of Shuangcheng District in Harbin, Heilongjiang province, China. As of 2018, it has 8 villages under its administration.

== See also ==
- List of township-level divisions of Heilongjiang
