= Vietnam under Chinese rule =

Four historical periods when Vietnam was ruled by Chinese dynasties

Vietnam under Chinese rule or Bắc thuộc (北屬 lit. 'belonging to the north') (111 BC–939 AD, 1407–1428 AD) refers to four historical periods during which several portions of modern-day northern and central Vietnam were governed by successive Chinese dynasties. Vietnamese historiography traditionally dates the beginning of this period to 111 BC, when the Han dynasty annexed Nanyue (Vietnamese: Nam Việt). Chinese control continued in various forms until 939 AD, when the Ngô dynasty was established, marking the end of what is usually referred to as the main phase of Chinese rule. A later period of occupation by the Ming dynasty from 1407 AD to 1428 AD is often treated as a distinct episode. Notably, parts of Vietnam were under Chinese rule for longer than several territories that now form the modern provinces of China, underlining the longevity and depth of Chinese influence in the region over many centuries.

The historiography of this period has become a subject of scholarly debate, particularly concerning how national and cultural identities have been retroactively applied. Historians such as Catherine Churchman, Jaymin Kim, and Keith W. Taylor argue that many narratives about Bắc thuộc are shaped by modern constructs, often influenced by nationalist or anti-colonial sentiment. These scholars emphasise that the idea of an unbroken narrative of resistance or subjugation simplifies a more complex historical relationship, which included periods of accommodation, syncretism and local autonomy. Recent research critiques the use of this history as a tool for contemporary nationalist and irredentist projects in Vietnam, China and elsewhere.

== Geographical extent and impact ==
The three Han dynasty commanderies (Jiaozhi, Jiuzhen, Rinan) of Vietnam in the southernmost part of the empire, 219 CE

The four periods of Chinese rule did not correspond to the modern borders of Vietnam, but were mainly limited to the area around the Red River Delta and adjacent areas. During the first three periods of Chinese rule, the pre-Sinitic indigenous culture was centered in the northern part of modern Vietnam, in the alluvial deltas of the Hong, Cả and Mã Rivers. Ten centuries of Chinese rule left a substantial genetic footprint, with settlement by large numbers of ethnic Han, while opening up Vietnam for trade and cultural exchange.

Elements of Chinese culture such as language, religion, art, and way of life constituted an important component of traditional Vietnamese culture until modernity. This cultural affiliation with China remained true even when Vietnam was militarily defending itself against attempted invasions, such as against the Yuan dynasty. Chinese characters remained the official script of Vietnam until French colonization in the 20th century, despite the rise in vernacular chữ Nôm literature in the aftermath of the expulsion of the Ming.

== History ==
=== Pre-Han ===
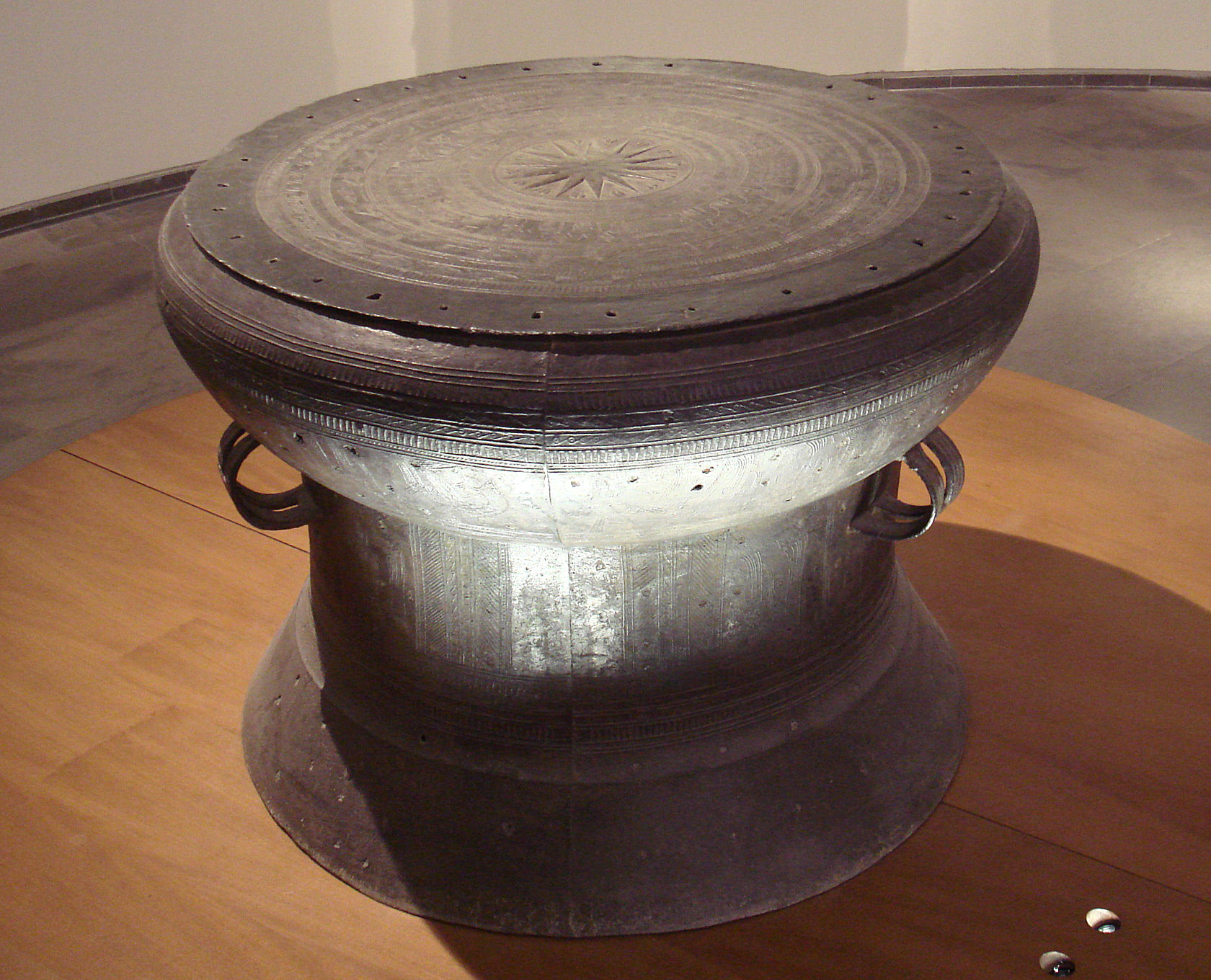
A Dong Son drum

Prior to the Han dynasty's conquest and colonization of the Red River Plain region, it was home to a material culture known as the Đông Sơn culture that flourished during the 5th century BC. It produced bronze drums using sophisticated lost wax technology. Material evidence of the Đông Sơn culture was however not exclusive to the Red River Plain and could be found from Malaysia to Fujian.

In the late 3rd century BC, the Red River Plain was the site of an urban center that came to be known as Cổ Loa (Ch. Guluo) in the Tây Vu (Ch. Xiyu) region in modern Phong Khê across the river from Hanoi. However the earliest written account of this site is a 6th century AD source compiled by Li Daoyuan (d. 527), in which it was unnamed. After that it was called the Việt Thường Citadel or the Khả Lâu Citadel in Lê Tắc's (1263-1342) An Nam chí lược. It was only in the 15th century that the site came to be known as Cổ Loa. The source provides a folk etymology of Cổ Loa attributing it to its shape: curving and twisting like a snail. Archaeological evidence from the site reveals that a highly organized society occupied the area and the ramparts of the citadel did form concentric spiraling earthen walls. They also had technologies such as crossbows, stamped earth, and terracotta roof tiles similar to regions further north.

Archaeologist Nam Kim estimates a population of around 5,000 people inhabiting Cổ Loa and tens of thousands in the surrounding area. The inhabitants had bronze ploughs and other implements supporting wet rice agriculture. They used both flooding and irrigation techniques to grow rice. By the time the Han arrived, the Red River Plain was already densely populated by wet rice farmers. However historian John Phan notes that there is no actual evidence that these people were Vietic or spoke a Vietic language. While it is plausible that they were Vietic speakers, it is also plausible that some or a small portion of them were, or that they spoke other Austroasiatic languages, or a combination of different languages.

According to the 6th century Commentary on the Classic of Waterways, an outsider named Thục conquered the Red River Plain by the end of the first millennium BC. Thục took the title of King An Dương (An Dương Vương). The later 15th century Đại Việt sử ký toàn thư describes a man named Thục Phán who ended 18 generations of Hùng kingship when he conquered Cổ Loa and named his kingdom Âu Lạc.

=== Nanyue ===
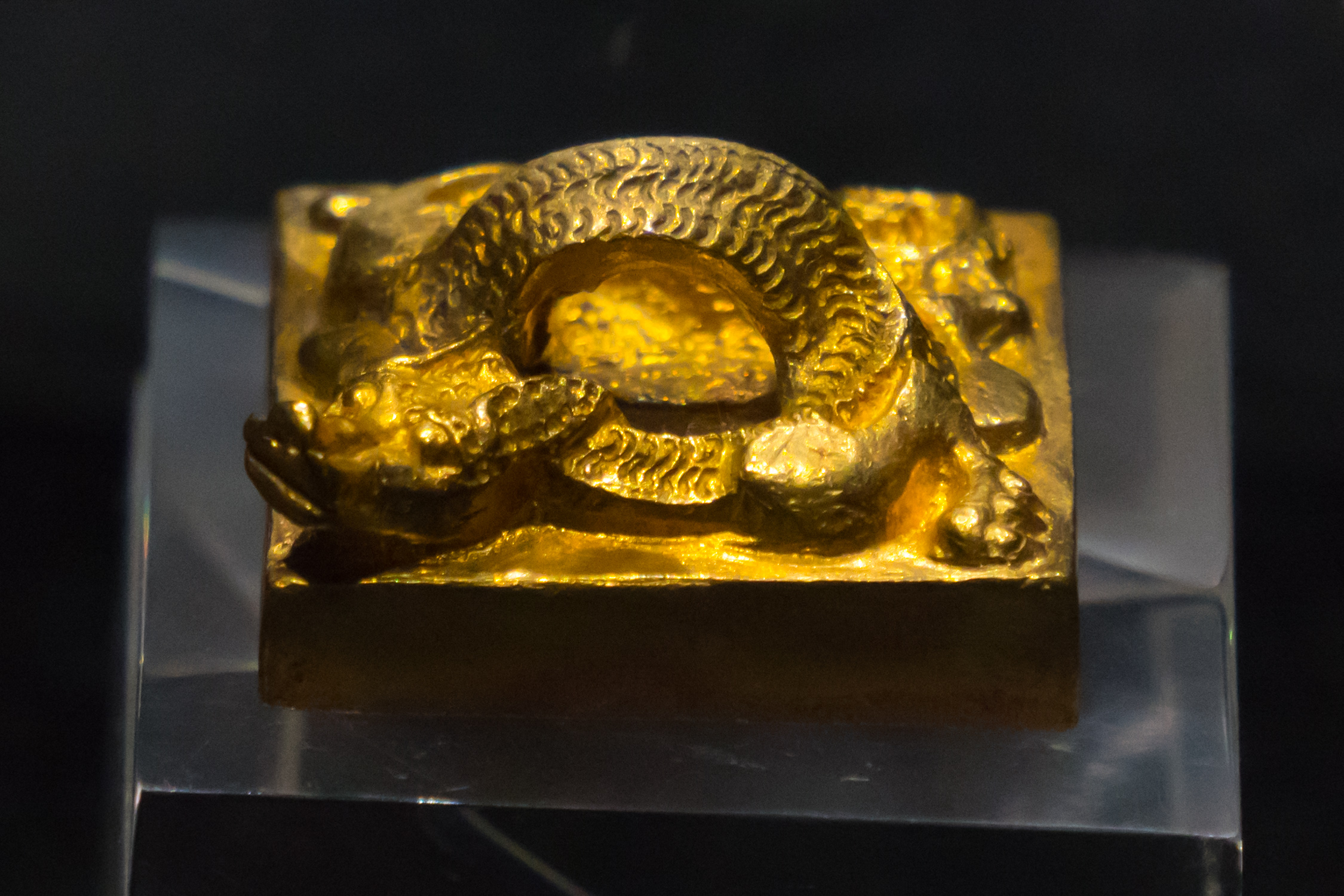
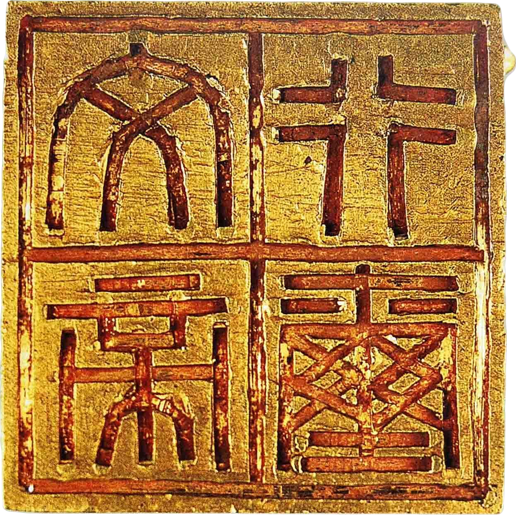
Gold seal excavated from the tomb of Zhao Mo, second King of Nanyue. The seal's characters, shown in detail on the right, read 文帝行壐 ("Imperial Seal of Emperor Wen"), which demonstrates the first Nanyue rulers' Emperor status within Nanyue itself.

The polity created by Thục Phán was conquered by a Qin dynasty general named Zhao Tuo. After the Qin disintegrated in 207 BC, Zhao established a polity called Nanyue (Southern Yue) encompassing southeastern China as well as the Red River Plain. This is confirmed by the Book of Han as well as archaeological evidence. The tomb of Zhao Tuo's grandson, Zhao Mo, contains iconography reminiscent to the Đông Sơn culture. Nanyue's capital was situated at Panyu in modern Guangzhou. The Red River Plain was named Jiaozhi (V. Giao Chỉ) Commandery by Zhao Tuo.

In 183 BC, Zhao Tuo proclaimed himself "martial emperor of Nanyue" but relinquished the title soon after in 180 BC when he submitted to the Emperor Wen of Han. However despite his symbolic submission, Zhao also made sure that the Han understood that Nanyue possessed substantial military might by claiming that he "secured a land of a hundred cities, from east to west, south to north numbering ten million li; my armies number over a million". As a result, Nanyue was not destroyed until 111 BC when it was conquered by the Han general Lu Bode. During Nanyue's reign, Jiaozhi was likely left relatively undisturbed in its governance, and handled its affairs according to its own political traditions.

=== Han dynasty ===
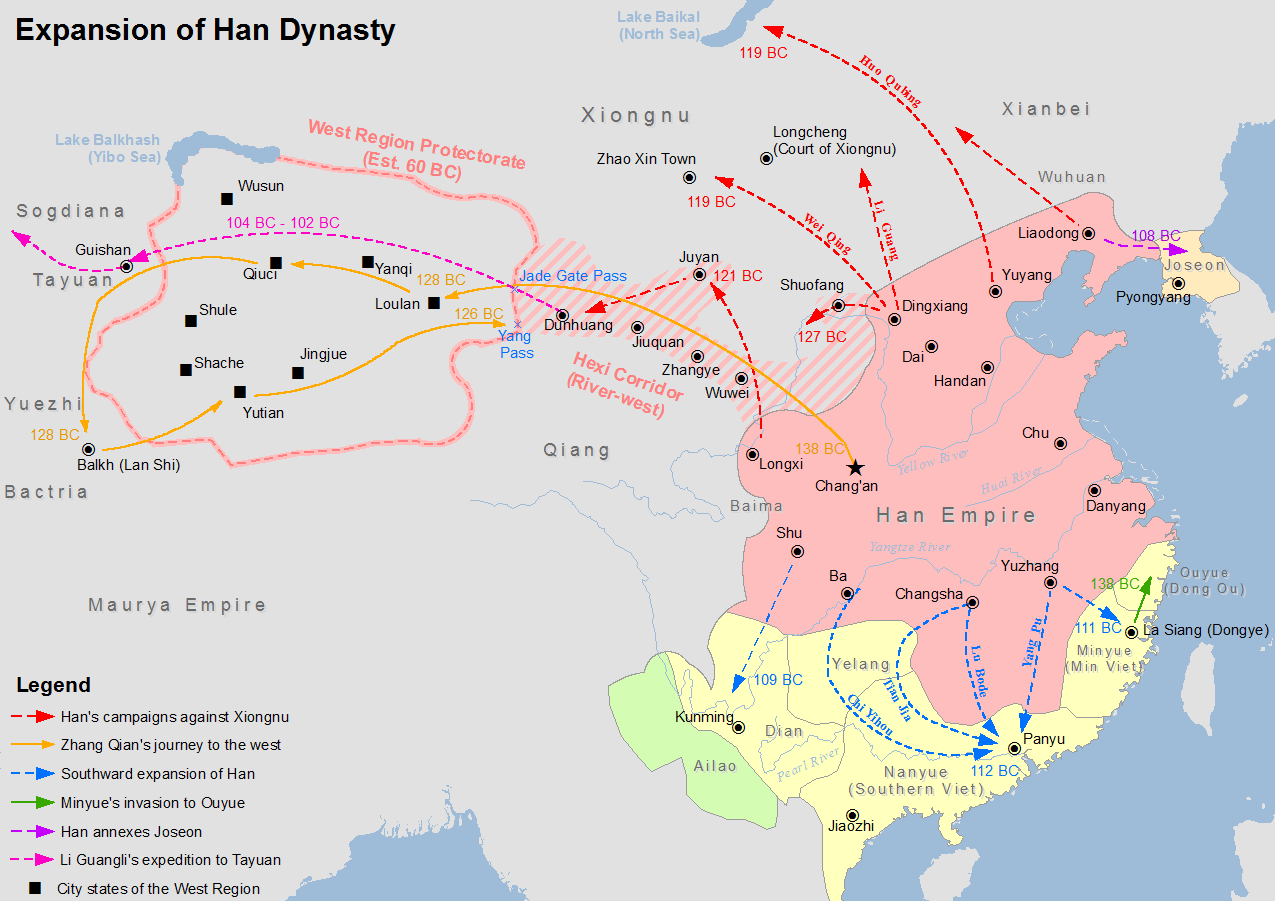
Han conquest of Nanyue in 112 BC

The Han dynasty reorganized Jiaozhi into the Jiaozhi Region (Jiaozhibu) consisting of seven commanderies. The commandery seat was initially located in Leilou (V. Luy Lâu). In 106 BC, the seat was relocated to Cangwu Commandery. A Western Han census in the year 2 AD recorded 92,440 hearths in Jiaozhi Commandery, 57,510 hearths in Cangwu Commandery, and 19,613 hearths in Nanhai Commandery. At the time, Jiaozhi was more densely populated than Guangdong and 58% of Jiaozhi's population was located in northern and north-central Vietnam.

During the Han period, Jiaozhi was an important trading hub as well as agricultural producer for neighboring regions. Trade in Southeast Asia, particularly maritime trade, passed through Jiaozhi before heading to other parts of the Han empire. The Han concentrated on controlling the Pearl River and Red River regions rather than controlling the hilly highlands. The most important overland trade route was through the Ghost Gate Pass, otherwise known as the Linzhang pass, that followed the Yu River (modern Beiliu River) from southwest Guangzhou to the sea in Hepu Commandery. The importance of Jiaozhi as a trading center meant that the Han placed direct administrators in the region unlike its predecessor, turning Jiaozhi into a major Han city in the centuries following the destruction of Nanyue.

The Trưng sisters rebelled against Han rule in 40 AD and established an independent rule at Mê Linh (C. Miling) at the center of the Red River Delta. In 42 AD, the Han general Ma Yuan was called in from the northern frontier of the empire after defeating the Xiongnu to lead Han forces against the Trưng sisters. Ma Yuan led over 2,000 ships and 20,000 plus warriors to strike at Douyang (V. Đô Dương) and Jiuzhen where the remaining clan members of Trưng Trắc were located. The leaders of the Trưng rebellion were beheaded. From Wugong (V. Vô Công) to Jufeng (V. Cư Phong), he captured over 5,000 men and pacified the region. Ma Yuan reported to the emperor that Xiyu (V. Tây Vu) district had 32,000 households and that it should be divided into two new districts: Fengxi (V. Phong Khê) and Wanghai (V. Vọng Hải). The emperor permitted this and wherever Ma Yuan went, new commanderies and districts were created. He organized the inner and outer walls of towns, dug irrigation canals, and made laws regarding the Yue people. In the latter half of the 4th century, a traveler named Yu Yiqi heading down the coast noted in a letter to his friend that in the area that is now central Vietnam, there lived descendants of soldiers who had come with Ma Yuan three hundred years ago. There were originally only 10 households, but they intermarried with each other and became 200 households, all named Ma, and were similar to other "Hua" people in their language and eating habits.

Material evidence such as the disappearance of the Đông Sơn drums following the Trưng sisters' defeat and the appearance of Han material culture devoid of Đông Sơn influence supports the theory that the Trưng sisters represented a failed indigenous uprising that saw the beginning of more intense Han administration over the region. The appearance of more than 120 Han brick tombs in the Red River region suggests growing Chinese migration into the area or significant cultural influence on the locals by these immigrants. The earliest Sino-Vietnamese loanwords also date from around this time.

By the end of the Han dynasty, a community of Sinitic speakers lived in Jiao alongside speakers of Ancient Northern Vietic (ANV), which continued to act as a political faction even after the end of the Han. Throughout the final years of the Han dynasty, Jiao was relatively stable with the exception of a rebellion that originated from Nanhai Commandery and spread to Jiaozhi, Jiuzhen, and Rinan from 178 until 181 AD. The rebellion, led by Liang Long, was defeated by general Zhu Jun, who later led many aristocrats to take refuge in Jiaozhi as the Yellow Turban Rebellion swept through the empire in 184 AD. Jiao was considered a stable and prosperous region under the governance of the Shi family, who themselves had migrated to Jiaozhi during the Wang Mang era (9-23 AD).

The stability of Jiao is described briefly by a Buddhist monk named Mou Bo in the late 2nd century AD. Mou remarked that though the empire was in disorder, Jiao was relatively calm, and so unusual men from the north moved there. Many of them became engaged in heterodox religious studies involving worship of gods and spirits, abstinence from cereals, and immortality. Mou objected to these behaviors.

=== Three Kingdoms ===
The Han dynasty fell in 220 AD and the period of disunity and invasion by non-Sinitic groups that followed caused large populations to migrate south. One path led migrants from Hebei and Shandong into the lower Yangzi, Zhejiang, and Fujian. The other major route of migration was from Shanxi and Shaanxi toward the upper Yangzi and then into Jiao in the Red River Plain. Over one million northerners migrated to the south in the early 4th century AD.

At the end of the Han dynasty, Jiaozhi was under the governance of Shi Xie (V. Sĩ Nhiếp), a man hailing from Cangwu Commandery. He inherited his father's position as Administrator of Jiaozhi Commandery in the 180s and his family took over Jiao Province in 190, ruling from Longbian (V. Long Biên) in modern Hanoi. In 203, he received imperial recognition as inspector of Jiao Province and governor of Jiaozhi. His administration was considered relatively stable and secluded from the wars in the north aside from the loss of Xianglin, a district in Rinan Commandery that broke away and became the Kingdom of Lâm Ấp.

Shi Xie played little to no role in the politics of the north and acquiesced to the demands of Sun Quan, sending his son as a hostage in 217. By the time Shi Xie died in 226 at the age of 90, he was reduced to only ruling Jiaozhi. His son Shi Hui did not inherit Jiaozhi and was given the post of prefect in Jiuzhen. Shi Hui rebelled against Sun Quan's rule but accepted an offer of peace if he surrendered peacefully, which Sun Quan's agent Lü Dai reneged on and killed Shi Hui, his brothers and his sons.

Shi Xie is primarily remembered today in Vietnam as Sĩ Nhiếp, the father of education and Buddhism, which he patronized greatly during his reign. He was credited with compiling a dictionary of Classical Chinese terms explained in vernacular Vietnamese language several centuries later. According to Stephen O'Harrow, Shi Xie was "the first Vietnamese."

In 231 AD, Xue Zong (d. 243), a refugee who had fled to Jiaozhi in the last years of the disintegrating Han dynasty, submitted a memorial to the court of Wu with a brief summary of the "civilizing" activities undertaken there. According to Xue, originally the people were like animals, wore topknots and primitive tunics, and ran barefoot. They had no leaders but governed themselves. Exiles and criminals from the Middle Kingdom lived among them. Gradually they were introduced to books and they started to understand the language. Greater communication via postal horses occurred. Grand Protector Xi Guang of Jiaozhi and Grand Protector Ren Yan of Rinan Commandery taught the people how to till and plough and wear caps and shoes. They constructed a Marital office, introduced betrothal dowries, and built schools for learning the Confucian Classics.

Customs are not uniform and languages are mutually unintelligible so that several interpreters are needed to communicate... The people are like birds and beasts; they wear their hair tied up and go barefoot, while for clothing they simply cut a hole in a piece of cloth for their head or they fasten their garments on the left side [in barbarian style]... If district-level officials are appointed, it is the same as if they were not... According to the records, civilizing activities have been going on for over four hundred years, but, according to what I myself have seen during many years of travel since my arrival here, the actual situation is something else... In Rinan Prefecture, men and women go naked without shame. In short, it can be said that these people are on the same level as bugs.

— Xue Zong

Xue further mentions the practice of levirate marriage at certain places in Jiaozhi and Jiuzhen. In Rinan, both men and women went about naked. The district offices controlled them through displays of force and organized the collection of taxes. Xue notes that even though the district offices collected numerous precious items, they were not compelled to submit them as taxes, leading to corruption, rebellion, and transgression against the law.

=== Jin dynasty ===
After the demise of the Three Kingdoms, the Jin dynasty (266–420) took over the administration of Jiao. Its control over Jiao was not up to the same standards as the Han, and it only registered a figure of 25,600 households for Jiao, reflecting a fraction of the actual population. The succeeding Liu Song dynasty (420–479) registered an even lower population at 10,453 households, suggesting that the Jiao aristocracy had considerable autonomy at this point.

During this period, production of bronze drums reminiscent to the Đông Sơn culture ceased in the Red River Plain, although it continued in the hilly hinterlands between the Red and Pearl Rivers. A new wave of Sinitic vocabulary can be traced to this era, supporting the north to south migration paradigm. According to Phan, Early Sino-Vietnamese vocabulary consists of two layers of borrowings: one from Ma Yuan's sinicization of Jiaozhi in the 1st century AD (Han ESV) and another layer from the influx of northern refugees in the early 4th century AD (Jin ESV).

After the death of Emperor Wu of Jin in 290, his realm was split by the War of the Eight Princes. After the previous governor Tao Huang died, the Jin appointed Wu Yan to govern Jiao. When he arrived, the soldiers of Jiuzhen were in open rebellion under the leadership of Trieu Chi. Wu Yan quelled the rebellion, executed Trieu Chi, and governed the province for many years through "mercy and majesty". Wu Yan's biography states that he was on assignment in the south for more than 20 years, although this may have included posts in areas other than Jiao. Eventually, Wu Yan requested a replacement, and the Jin sent a man named Gu Bi to take his post sometime prior to 311. When Gu Bi passed away, leaders in Jiao asked his son Can to take authority over the province. The imperial government in the north had already fallen and the empire was in disarray. Local families simply agreed that Gu Can should continue his father's rule.

Gu Bi's brother, Shou, rebelled against the provincial leaders and killed the senior clerk, Ho Trieu, who acted as the governor's deputy. Resistance against Shou gathered around a field commander named Lương Thạc. Shou attempted to have Lương Thạc killed, but he escaped and mobilized his soldiers to capture Shou, who was forced to kill himself by drinking poison. Lương Thạc ruled Jiao for several years with the aid of Tao Wei, a son of Tao Huang, who acted as a figurehead for three years before he died.

To the north in Guangzhou, Wang Ji was put in power by anti-Jin local leaders. While Wang Ji resisted Jin imperial authority, he also did not outright rebel against them. To show his loyalty, he requested permission to govern Jiao, which was granted, resulting in an attack on Lương Thạc. After failing to defeat Lương Thạc, Wang Ji rebelled against the Jin and was forced to flee into the mountains where he died of illness.

Wang Ji was replaced in Guangzhou by Tao Kan in 318. Meanwhile Lương Thạc faced a rebellion by Du Zan, the leader of northern migrants who were sympathetic to Wang Ji and wanted to submit to imperial authority. Lương Thạc defeated Du Zan and proclaimed himself prefect of Jiaozhi while using Xiu Zhan, the son of a former general, as a figurehead. For the next few years, the situation was stable as Tao Kan was preoccupied with consolidating Jin presence in Guangzhou.

In 322, Wang Liang was appointed governor of Jiao and instructed with killing both Lương Thạc and Xiu Zhan. Lương Thạc was afraid of resisting because Tao Kan had amassed a considerable amount of military power, and chose instead to welcome Wang Liang into the province. Lương Thạc continued to hold considerable power in Jiao alongside Wang Liang, however, Xiu Zhan was unhappy with the arrangement and left for Jiuzhen. Wang Liang's men captured and executed Xiu Zhan. Lương Thạc rebelled, laid siege to Longbian, and severed Wang Liang's arm. Wang Liang died ten days later. Tao Kan sent one of his generals, Gao Bao, to recapture Jiao. Within a year, Lương Thạc was captured and beheaded.

Tao Kan was named governor of Jiao but had to deal with a rebellion in the north and left the province under the control of Gao Bao. In 326, the Jin official Yuan Fang was given the governorship of Jiao. When he approached the Jiao border, Yuan Fang invited Gao Bao to a dinner in order to kill him in an ambush, but the plot was discovered and Gao Bao attacked him first. Yuan Fang fled to Jiao where he died suddenly from an unquenchable thirst.

In 328, the Taoist Truong Lien rose to power in Jiao and invaded Guangzhou before being defeated by a Jin general.

=== Period of disunion ===
A late 3rd century work notes that there was a constant stream of people taking their families by sea to Jiaozhou. A record from 306 states that there was famine and disease in Ningzhou (modern Yunnan) as well as barbarians who had become too powerful for the imperial armies to overcome, causing commoners and officials to leave for Jiaozhou.

One of the emigrée families that ended up in power was the Du clan that migrated from Chang'an to Jiao in the early 4th century. After three generations of leadership in Jiao, Du Hongwen (V. Đỗ Hoằng Văn) received an imperial summon from the Liu Song court in 427 and journeyed to the capital posthaste. The Liu Song appointed Du Huidu as an assistant magistrate and "protector general of refugees" of Jiaozhou. This title was passed down to his son, Hongwen. In 468, Lý Trường Nhân (C. Li Changren) rebelled and punished either the "refugees from the north" or "troops of the department magistrate from the north".

In the 5th century, Buddhist influence started becoming more prevalent in Jiao. A philosophical conversation between a Jiaozhi Regional Inspector (cishi) named Li Miao (V. Lý Miễu) and two Jiaozhi Buddhist masters named Dao Gao (V. Đạo Cao) and Fo Ming (V. Pháp Minh) is recorded in the Hongming ji ("Collection for the Propagation of Buddhism/Light") compiled by Shi Sengyou (445-518) of the Liang dynasty. Li Miao distrusted the growing popularity of Buddhism and questioned the two Buddhists why the Buddha did not manifest in the real world. Dao Gao's response was entrenched in both Confucian and Taoist rhetoric, showing that both sides, whether Confucian or Buddhist, were thoroughly entrenched in a Sinitic tradition.

=== Vạn Xuân ===
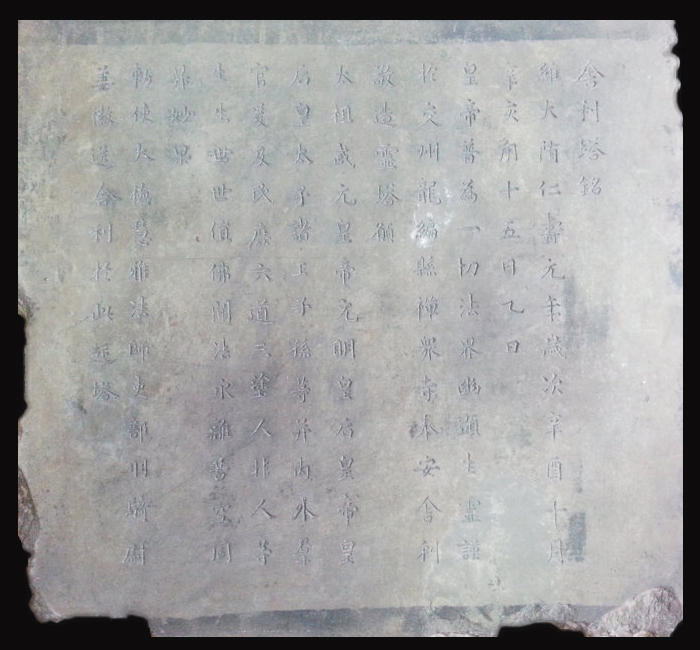
Oldest stele with Chinese characters in Vietnam, early 7th century

In the early 6th century, two natives of Jiao, Tỉnh Thiệu (C. Jing Shao) and Lý Bôn (C. Li Bi) sought appointment in the newly risen Liang dynasty. However they were disappointed by the hyper-elitist Liang court which rejected them on grounds of non-elite affiliation. After Tỉnh Thiệu was rejected due to never having produced a scholar in his family, he was assigned to oversee one of the capital's gates. Resentful at the dismissal of his abilities, he refused the assignment and returned with Lý Bôn in 523. Lý Bôn was descended from northern migrants who had moved into Jiao over 500 years ago. When the governor of Jiao, Xiao Zi (V. Tiêu Tư), extorted the Jiao citizenry, Lý Bôn rebelled against the Liang. He defeated a Liang punitive expedition in 544 before declaring himself the "southern emperor" (Nam Đế/Nandi) of the state of Vạn Xuân (C. Wanchun). The Liang sent another army against Lý Bôn, this time led by Chen Baxian, which succeeded in defeating the rebel army. Lý Bôn was betrayed by Lao tribesmen he sought refuge with and his head was sent to the Liang court. Despite having successfully defeated Lý Bôn, the Liang dynasty was already falling apart by the mid-6th century, and Chen overthrew it, setting up his own Chen dynasty. Vạn Xuân continued to exist under the rule of Lý Phật Tử, who was a relative of Lý Bôn. The Chen dynasty was too weak to pose a threat to Vạn Xuân and the two states maintained amicable relations, even exchanging personnel on a few occasions. This situation changed when the Sui dynasty conquered the Chen in 589. As the Sui consolidated power over Guangdong and Guangxi, Lý Phật Tử initially recognized their suzerainty, but later rebelled in 602. The Sui general Liu Fang took Lý Phật Tử's army by surprise and coerced him to surrender. Lý Phật Tử was sent to Chang'an and his subordinates were executed. Lý Bôn is remembered in Vietnam as Lý Nam Đế, or "Lý the Southern Emperor".

=== Sui dynasty ===
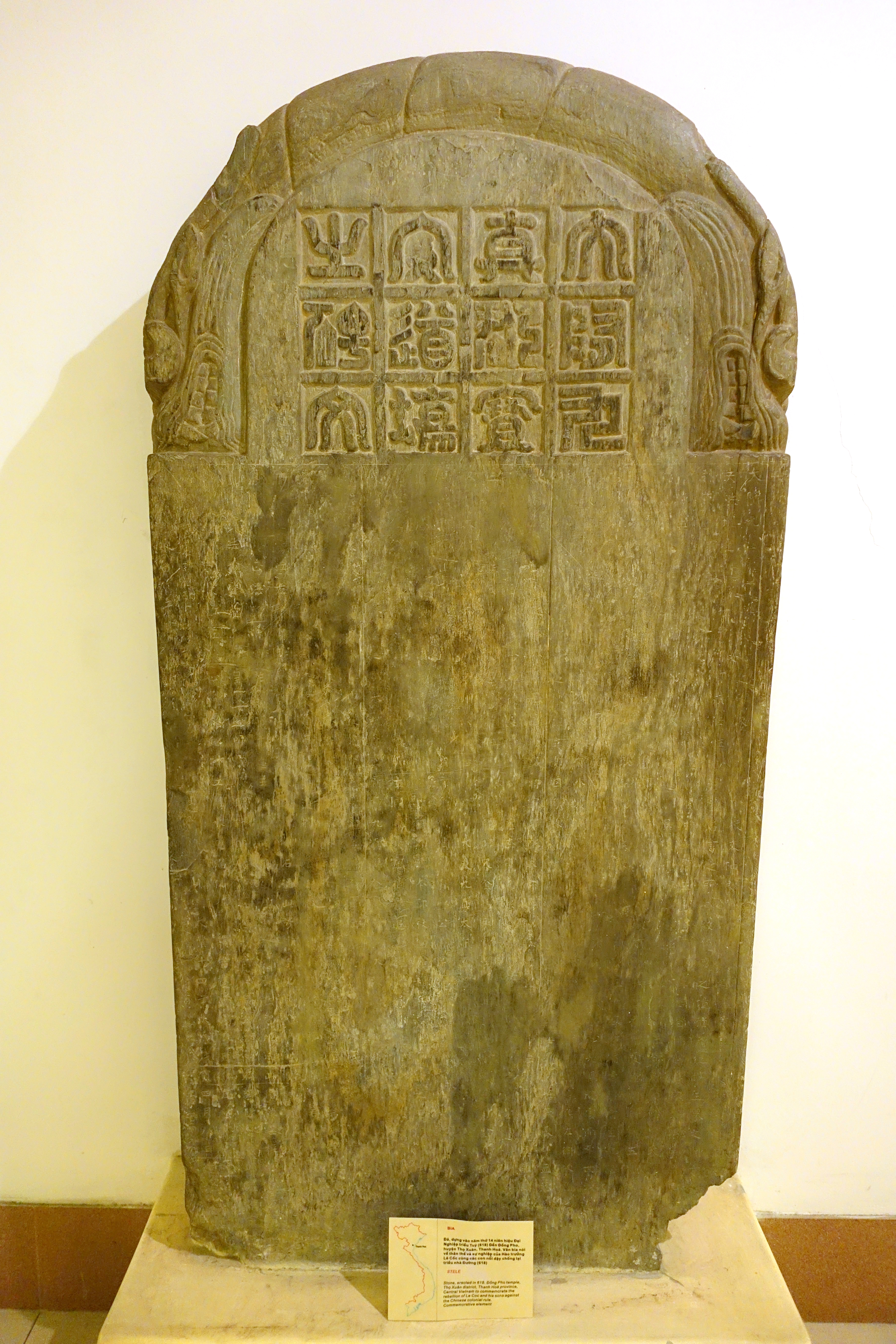
Inscription of the Temple of Precious Peace of Jiuzhen Commandery of the Great Sui (大隋九真 郡寶安道場之碑文), praising a Sui dynasty officer named "Governor Li" (V. Lê) for resisting the Tang dynasty, discovered in Thanh Hóa

The Sui dynasty reorganized Jiao into a single region comprising three prefectures corresponding to the former territory of Jiaozhi and Jiuzhen. By this time Rinan had been lost to the Cham kingdom of Lâm Ấp. The Sui recorded a total of 56,566 households, a significant increase over the previous era, probably as a result of the Sui government's stronger administrative capabilities. In the Sui's waning years, a man from Luoyang named Qiu He was sent to secure Jiao. Qiu He's competent rule insulated Jiao from the fall of the Sui much like Shi Xie did during the late Han dynasty. When the succeeding Tang dynasty entered the region in 622, Qiu He immediately submitted to the new dynasty and was appointed administrator of Jiao. Qiu He returned north in his seventies when he retired.

=== Tang dynasty ===
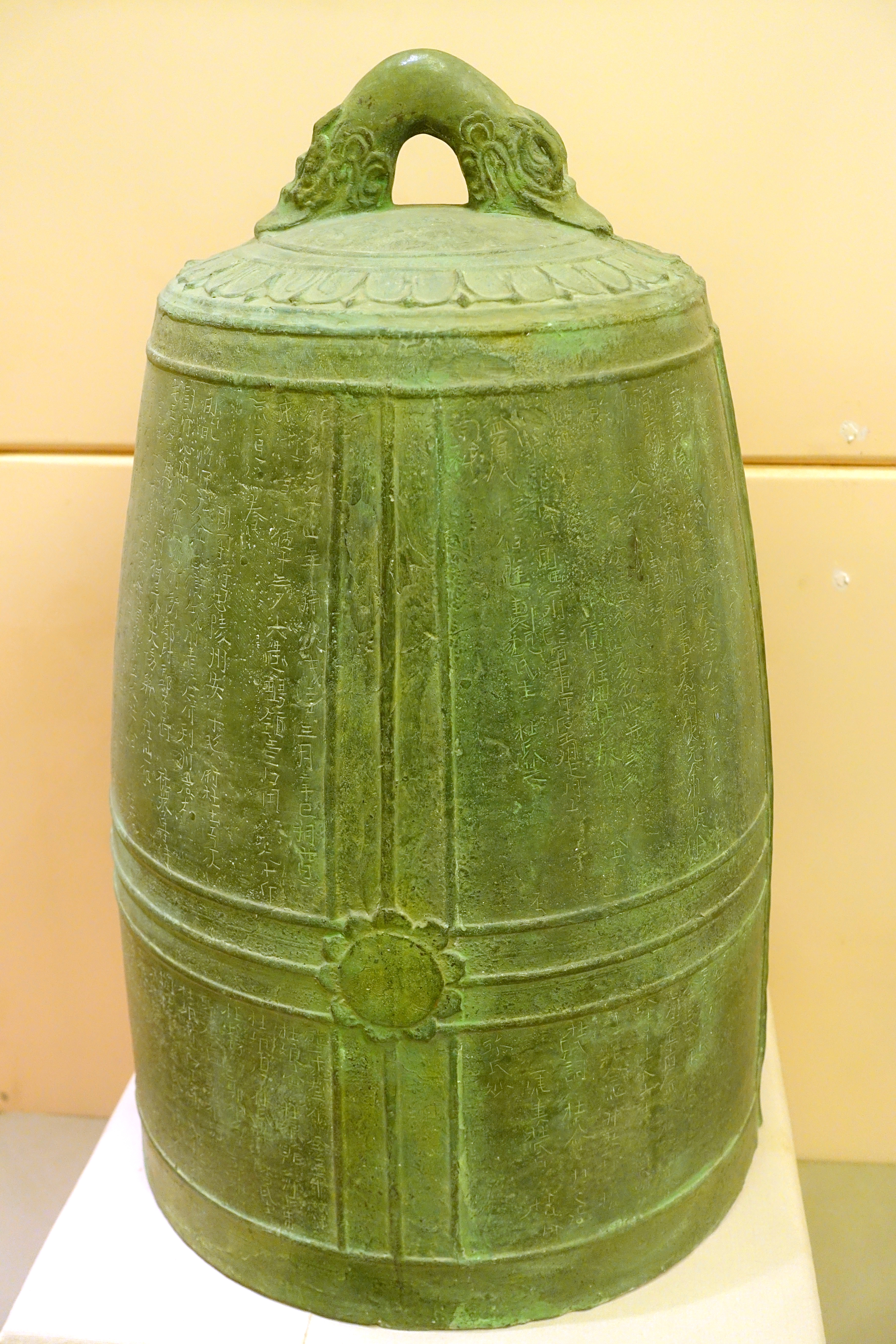
Ritual bell (replica) cast in 798 AD bearing names (in Chinese characters) of 243 members of a Buddhist association: 135 women and 108 men in Hanoi

The Tang dynasty reorganized Jiao into numerous smaller prefectures in the 620s and then after several reforms, remade Jiao into the Protectorate of Annan (Annan Duhufu), meaning "Protectorate of the Calm South". Annan was administered by a "protectors-general" or "commanders-in-chief" (dudu). This title was later changed to Military Commissioner (jiedushi/tiết độ sử). The southernmost part of Annan, called Huanzhou (modern Vinh, Nghệ An province), was composed of "halter-provinces" (jimizhou/cơ mi châu) where tribal lords were granted titles and acted as buffers against the Cham kingdom of Lâm Ấp. In 669, another prefecture even further south of Huanzhou was created, called Fuluzhou, and more halter-provinces were created there as well.

The population distribution in southern China changed during the Tang period. In the past, the Red River Plain had been the most densely populated area in the region, but both Guangdong and Guangxi had caught up and surpassed Annan as population centers during the Tang. Censuses for Jiaozhou recorded 24,230 households in 742 and 27,135 households in 807. The increase in population might have been due to refugees from the An Lushan rebellion. By the 700s, census data recorded a total of 38,626 households for all of Annan, 71,805 for Guangdong, and 274,696 for Guangxi. The demographic situation had reversed from Han times and Jiaozhou was no longer the largest settlement in the region.

Aside from the population reversal, other factors also caused the decline of Jiaozhou as the preeminent trading hub in the region. Deep sea trading routes were discovered directly connecting Guangzhou to Southeast Asia. The Dayu mountain road was expanded, making Guangzhou easier to access from the center of the empire than Jiaozhou. The kingdom of Chenla to the west of Jiaozhou declined in importance and was replaced by Lâm Ấp as the master of trading ports along the Annan coast. As the Pearl River Basin became an increasingly well-integrated and crucial part of the empire, views on Annan shifted to that of an increasingly distant and potentially troubled region. Although Annan continued to retain economic significance as a source of luxury goods, posts at Annan were viewed as almost something akin to punishments by government officials. One official named Lu Zushang was appointed by Tang Taizong to oversee Annan, but he refused the assignment on pretext of illness. When he still refused after the emperor sent his brother-in-law to convince him, the emperor had him executed. The undesirability of being assigned to Annan meant that the primary way of staffing the administration there was through demotion and banishment.

In 687, Liu Yanyou, the new governor of Annan, tried to levy full taxes on the Li people, who had been given special tax exemptions requiring them to pay only half the normal tax rate. The indigenous peasants under chief Lý Tự Tiên (C. Li Sixian) resisted. Liu Yanyou killed Lý. Đinh Kiến (C. Ding Jian), one of Lý's compatriots, led the people against Yanyou and besieged him in Songping. In the summer, the rebels took Songping and put Yanyou to death. A governor general, Feng Yuanchang, had earlier been called in to help Liu, but Feng hoped to gain influence at Liu's expense and did nothing to help him. Instead Feng established a fortified camp and sent envoys to the rebels telling them to kill their leader and join him. After Liu was killed, Feng abandoned Annan. Another general, Cao Xuanjing, marched into Annan, put down the rebellion, and executed Đinh Kiến.

In 722, a man from Huanzhou named Mai Thúc Loan (Mei Shuluan) rose up in rebellion with some 400,000 followers of non-Sinitic origin from 23 counties and seized Annan. Calling himself the "Black Emperor" (Hắc Đế/Heidi), Mai Thúc Loan represented followers of diverse origins from the southern periphery of the Tang empire, with recruits from Lâm Ấp and Chenla. They plundered food and other items during their reign in Annan. A Tang army of 100,000 from Guangdong under general Yang Zixu, including a "multitude" of mountain tribesmen who had remained loyal to the Tang, marched directly along the coast, following the old road built by Ma Yuan. Yang Zixu attacked Mai Thúc Loan by surprise and suppressed the rebellion in 723. While his rebellion was short lived, his historical role was later given greater importance by the 18th century Tây Sơn dynasty when it canonized him, despite not having been a "local" or even "proto-Vietnamese".

The An Lushan rebellion (755-763) caused massive upheaval in the Tang dynasty from which it never fully recovered. Early in the rebellion, tribal people set up at least seven kingdoms between Annan and the Tang empire, cutting off contact between the two until 758 when the Tang reclaimed the region. In the aftermath, the administrators of Annan became jiedushi (military commissioners). In the late 8th century, a man named Phùng Hưng hailing from Fengzhou (Phong) raised an army and took control of Annan. Phùng Hưng came from further west of the Jiao heartland and further away from the center of Sinitic influence. He was described as a charismatic strongman who was given the posthumous title "Vua cái đại vương" (Great King-Great King) by his son Phùng An. The title is a combination of words from Ancient Northern Vietic (vua cái 布蓋) and Sinitic (đại vương 大王) for "great king". Phùng Hưng and his son Phùng An increased trading activity in Annan during their rule and briefly overtook Guangzhou's pre-eminence in maritime trade. In 803, another jiedushi was appointed to Annan. When he arrived with conciliatory messages to Phùng An, he willingly acquiesced to the appointment and surrendered control of Annan to the Tang.

In 854, the new jiedushi of Annan, Li Zhuo, provoked hostility with the mountain tribes by prohibiting the salt trade and killing powerful chieftains, resulting in the defection of prominent local leaders in Fengzhou and beyond to Nanzhao. When Li Zhuo began suffering defeats, Đỗ Tồn Thành, a military commander of Aizhou, allied himself with the tribal chiefs against Li. The chieftain Lý Do Độc, as well as others, submitted to Nanzhao. In 858, Nanzhao invaded Annan while the new jiedushi, Li Hu, killed the son of a chieftain who was implicated in a mutiny, further alienating powerful clans in Annan and causing them to defect to Nanzhao. While Nanzhao invaded in earnest, the Đỗ clan rebelled with 30,000 men. Then in early 863, Nanzhao and tribal allies took Songping after a bitter siege. There was general chaos as Nanzhao ravaged Annan, alienating the locals, and the balance of power see-sawed between Tang and Nanzhao forces. In 864, the experienced Tang general, Gao Pian, led a counterattack that saw the defeat of Nanzhao forces in 866. He recaptured Songping, the capital of Annan, and named the rebuilt capital Daluo (V. Đại La). He also renamed the region of Annan to Jinghai Jun (Tĩnh Hải quân, lit. Peaceful Sea Army).

Gao Pian rebuilt the capital citadel of Daluo, repaired 5,000 meters of damaged wall, and reconstructed 400,000 bays for its residents. More than half of the local rebels fled into the mountains at this time. This may well have sealed the separation of the Muong from the Viet people, which historians such as Henri Maspero suggest based on linguistic evidence took place at the end of Tang rule in Annan.

The war ended with the formal reassertion of Tang rule over Vietnam. But Tang was already far down the road to collapse, and the regime that emerged from the postwar reconstruction was the first of a number of transitional regimes that finally led to the establishment of an independent Vietnamese monarchy. If Tang had failed to win the war, it is difficult to imagine how Vietnamese society would have developed. As it happened, the outcome of the Nanzhao War affirmed Vietnam's long-standing ties to Chinese civilization. This was as much a decision of the Vietnamese as it was of Tang, for many Vietnamese seem to have viewed Gao Pian as a liberator who freed them from Nanzhao's reign of plunder.

— Keith Weller Taylor

A campaign against the local population in Annan was conducted from 874 to 879. In 877, troops deployed from Annan in Guangxi mutined. In 880, the army in Annan mutinied, took the city of Daluo, and forced the military commissioner Zeng Gun to flee, ending de facto Chinese control in Vietnam.

== Historiography ==
=== French historiography ===
The historiography of Vietnam under Chinese rule has had substantial influence from French colonial scholarship and Vietnamese postcolonial national history writing. During the 19th century, the French promoted the view that Vietnam had little of its own culture and borrowed it almost entirely from China. French scholars and officials did this to justify European colonial rule in Vietnam. By portraying the Vietnamese as merely borrowers of civilization, the French situated themselves in a historical paradigm of bringing civilization to a backwards region of the world. French scholar Léonard Aurousseau argued that not only did Vietnam borrow culturally and politically from China, the population of Vietnam was also directly the result of migration from the state of Yue in China. This line of thought was followed by Joseph Buttinger, who authored the first English language history book on Vietnamese history. He believed that to fight off the Chinese, the Vietnamese had to become like the Chinese.

Adrien Launay, historian of the Missions-Étrangères, characterized the Vietnamese as copiers of Chinese civilization who made no discernible improvements in either the arts or the sciences. Other scholars such as Eliacin Lurô and Paul Ory espoused the same view that Vietnamese society was a poor man's version of China. This narrative was modified to an extent by individuals such as Camille Briffaut, who proposed that the Vietnamese successfully adapted Chinese institutions to expand their territory south and west. On 20 January 1900, the École Française d’Extrême Orient (EFEO) was created as the academic arm of the French colonial state, and its Orientalists later challenged this framework because they considered the association with China to be detrimental to French colonial interests. Louis Finôt, first director of the EFEO, offered an alternative policy that engaged in "discovering the origins, explaining the anomalies, and justifying the diversity" of the Indochina colonies. Eventually the EFEO developed a model of Southeast Asia characterized by the influence of Hinduism, however Vietnam did not fit this model neatly and had a more ambivalent relationship to it.

=== Vietnamese national historiography ===
==== Origin ====
Few historiographies have borne such a strong national imprint as that of Việt Nam in the twentieth century. Engaged through much of that century in a fierce battle for national identity and survival, Vietnamese historians and their international sympathizers focused intently on the grand narrative of national struggle against China, France, and America. Only recently has a new generation of historians been able to explore the political and cultural complexities of relations between the myriad peoples who have inhabited the Indo-Chinese peninsula without having to consider the effect of their words on national struggle.

— Nhung Tuyet Tran and Anthony Reid

The national school of Vietnamese history portrays the period in "a militant, nationalistic, and very contemporary vision through which emerged a hypothetical substratum of an original Vietnam that was miraculously preserved throughout a millennium of the Chinese presence." The national Vietnamese narrative depicts the Chinese as a corrupt and profit-driven people and merely the first of the foreign colonizing empires that were eventually driven from Vietnam. According to Catherine Churchman, this is not an entirely new historical tradition, but a rewriting or updating of it, and has roots in Dai Viet, which portrayed itself as the Southern Empire equal to the Northern Empire (China). Dai Viet literati of the Trần and Lê dynasties sought an ancient origin for their autonomy prior to Chinese rule and traced their genealogy to Triệu Đà or the semi-legendary Hồng Bàng dynasty. They recorded that the Northern Empire suffered defeat for not respecting these views. However, scholars such as Nhi Hoang Thuc Nguyen, Xinru Ma, David C. Kang, and John D. Phan argue that this vision of Vietnamese history as a long running resistance against foreign oppression and influence by China is a modern 20th century construction.

During the anti-colonial struggle against France and the United States, the Democratic Republic of Vietnam started to reconstruct history as part of its nation-building process, which included the creation of a homogeneous national identity and a national consciousness that covered both North and South Vietnam. Although part of the anti-colonial movement involved rejecting French rule, Vietnamese nationalists and postcolonial scholars were informed by both colonial views that they were a lesser version of China as well as unique from China. As a result, efforts to decolonize the past were at least partially in response to the fear of being seen as a derivative of China, and also drew on colonial scholarship (EFEO) that sought to separate Vietnam from Chinese influence. Young intellectuals in colonial Vietnam were taught a version of French nationalist history in a linear unified fashion starting with the Gauls stretching down to the modern nation-state. Like nationalist projects in other parts of the world, the Vietnamese replicated this type of historical narrative starting with the Hùng kings as the primordial, and importantly non-Chinese, origin and wellspring of national Vietnamese identity.

Patricia M. Pelley calls what followed the union of two endeavors - the search for a national origin and the theme of the "fighting spirit of the Vietnamese" - the "cult of antiquity". The cult of antiquity provided a "conceptual, visual, and ritual center for national identity" that served to deconstruct the trappings of colonial scholarship. Scholars like Trần Trọng Kim and Phạm Văn Sơn traced the Vietnamese past to increasingly ancient origins from the Âu Lạc in the 3rd century BC to Lạc Long Quân in the 3rd millennium BC and finally Thần Nông, the Vietnamese version of the Chinese mythological ruler Shennong. By 1975, the cult of antiquity had become fully established and ancient semi-mythological figures such as the Hùng kings were firmly entrenched in the daily life of the Vietnamese as their national origin.

In the 1950s and 1960s, Vietnamese scholars decided to "desinicize the [Vietnamese] past" by emphasizing Vietnam's status as a long-standing, independent, and unique civilization. Activities associated with the se déchinoiser ("de-chinese") effort included claiming archaeological artifacts as distinctive Vietnamese technological innovations and reframing history as a national-territorial narrative of "Kinh" (ethnic Vietnamese) people perpetually resisting against foreign invasion. The trope of the "ancient Chinese invasion" was applied to propaganda campaigns against American influence in the South starting in 1956. Due to the works of postcolonial academic scholars and the needs of anti-colonial resistance groups, a historical narrative of "ancient, continuous, ethnically-grounded and even 'traditional' conflict with China" was created. The North Vietnamese scholar and first president of the Institute of History Trần Huy Liệu made a direct connection between the period of Chinese rule and French rule, characterizing both as examples of the indomitable spirit of resistance intrinsic to Vietnamese history.

==== Western dissemination ====
Works by Japanese scholars in the 1970s as well as in the English language in the 1980s have taken on elements of the national school. Katakura Minoru's Chūgoku shihaika no betonamu emphasizes the innate characteristics of the Vietnamese people. Keith Taylor's The Birth of Vietnam (1983) asserts a strong continuity from the semi-legendary kingdoms of the Red River Plain to the founding of Dai Viet, which was the result of a thousand-year struggle against the Chinese that culminated in the restoration of Vietnamese sovereignty. The model of Vietnamese resistance against Chinese occupiers was used to explain to the U.S. public the steadfast Vietnamese resistance against French and U.S. military operations. John D. Phan notes that much of American research into Vietnamese history following the Vietnam War was predicated on their need for closure and the nationalist rhetoric of Vietnamese struggle against imperialist aggression appealed to such sentiments. Jennifer Holmgren's The Chinese Colonisation of Northern Vietnam uses Sinicization and Vietnamization as terms to refer to political and cultural change in different directions. Works following the national school of Vietnamese history retroactively assign Vietnamese group consciousness to past periods (Han-Tang era) based on evidence in later eras. The national school of Vietnamese history has remained practically unchanged since the 1980s and has become the national orthodoxy.

Liam C. Kelley notes that most scholars avoided questioning Vietnamese national unity during the latter half of the 20th century due to its controversial nature. Out of sympathy for modern Vietnamese nationalism, scholars chose to portray Vietnamese history through the lens of a united Vietnamese people repeatedly fighting off Chinese aggression. To accomplish this objective, scholars were required to ignore certain inconvenient aspects of historical records such as literature by Vietnamese envoys expressing solidarity with Chinese culture, appeals by Vietnamese rulers for Chinese intervention, and alternative interpretations of historical texts.

According to Catherine Churchman, recent Western scholarship has started to move on from depicting "primordialist historical narratives of a Việt people originating in prehistory and surviving (though somewhat modified) as a distinct population throughout the millennium of Chinese domination". Even in Vietnam, new historians seem to be moving in the same trajectory. However works as recent as Ben Kiernan's Việt Nam: A History from Earliest Times to the Present (2017) have reiterated the same tropes while introducing new ones. A number of historians such as Churchman, Kelley, Phan, and Gerard Sasges have criticized Kiernan's work for various reasons. Churchman criticized Kiernan for trying to rework outdated scholarship and in the process produced a narrative with so many errors that it would constitute a major project to list them all. Of particular note is Kiernan's inability to read Classical Chinese or Vietnamese sources, restricting him to secondary sources in English and French, a criticism that is also shared by Kelley. Sasges points out that Kiernan depends almost entirely on translations and his book contains few direct references to either Vietnamese or Chinese sources. Phan made similar criticisms of Kiernan's work and used it as an example of how pervasive anachronistic assumptions had become even in high quality scholarly works.

==== Criticisms ====
Since the 1990s, the historical paradigms introduced by the nationalist school of Vietnamese historiography have been criticized by several scholars including Catherine Churchman, Keith W. Taylor, Haydon Cherry, Patricia M. Pelley, Jaymin Kim, and Gerard Sasges. As Sasages describes, there has been a "stream of historiography, dominant in US academia in the 1960s, 70s, and 80s, that projected the existence of a Vietnamese nation back millennia and located the core of its identity in a supposed tradition of resistance to foreign rule". This image of Vietnamese history has since been deconstructed by a generation of scholars from the 1990s onward.

Churchman categorizes the argument for an intrinsic, intractable, and distinctly Southeast Asian Vietnamese identity in the Red River Plain throughout history into three categories: context, cultural continuity, and resistance. Context refers to the downplaying of similarities between Vietnam and China while emphasizing Vietnam's Southeast Asian identity in the postcolonial period. The purpose of this was to establish Vietnam as a focal point of Southeast Asia rather than as an insignificant periphery of East Asia. Cultural continuity refers to an intrinsic Vietnamese "cultural core" that has always existed in the Red River Plain since time immemorial. Resistance refers to the national struggle of the Vietnamese people against foreign aggressors. Proponents of this historical narrative, such as Nguyen Khac Vien, characterize the history of Vietnam under Chinese rule as a "steadfast popular resistance marked by armed insurrections against foreign domination", while opponents such as Churchman note the lack of evidence, anachronisms, linguistic problems, adherence to Chinese political and cultural norms, and similarities as well as differences with other peoples under Chinese rule.

Keith W. Taylor was originally a proponent of the nationalist school of Vietnamese history when his work The Birth of Vietnam was published in 1983. In The Birth of Vietnam, Taylor espoused the same fundamental tenets as Vietnamese national history where an unbroken line of descent stretching back to the legendary Hùng king culminated in the restoration of Vietnamese sovereignty after a thousand-year resistance against the Chinese. Taylor later retracted from this position and criticized the "rigid overarching narrative of the Vietnamese people or the Vietnamese nation". He also challenged the view that Vietnam developed a tradition of resistance against foreign aggressors due to regular invasions by China.

According to John D. Phan, the narrative of "Vietnamese history and culture as one of a pre-Sinitic people 'surviving' long centuries of Chinese rule" that emerged unchanged after a thousand years is one born from a modern nationalist ideology. This teleological agenda forces a cultural and linguistic continuity between the post-Tang dynasty era Vietnamese culture and the Đông Sơn culture as well as disparate rulers that ruled independently of imperial China. Phan describes this assumption as an oversimplification at best and nationalistic denial at worst. Language has been used as evidence for a distinct Vietnamese identity in the Han-Tang period. However, Phan's research argues that the formation of a Vietnamese language occurred afterward as the result of a language shift involving a dialect known as Annamese Middle Chinese (AMC) and Ancient Northern Vietic (ANV). While noting that Chinese influence on the Vietnamese language has been overstated at times and that Vietnamese is still an Austroasiatic language at its core, Phan disagrees with the characterization of Sinitic influence as a "flat and blunt force" and seeks to move beyond anachronistic binaries such as "China" versus "Vietnam" or "East" versus "Southeast Asia". Phan argues that neither the existence of AMC and ANV in the Red River Plain made it "Chinese" in the past or the Vietnamese its true "native people".

Patricia M. Pelley remarks that postcolonial scholars undoubtedly favored disengaging from Chinese culture and establishing new cultural norms. However, in many cases, this essentially meant severing their own link to the past on a societal and individual level due to how intertwined the notions of culture and education were with Chinese civilization in premodern Vietnam. Pelley compared Chinese culture in Vietnam to Greek and Roman culture in Renaissance Europe, surmising that the "death" of Latin made acknowledging their Latinate past easier than Vietnam with Chinese culture. The effort to reach into the ancient past to provide a source for national identity, which Pelley calls the "cult of antiquity", introduced new problems that future historians will have to solve.

==== Ethnic unity ====
The Vietnamese national narrative has introduced anachronisms in order to prove a unified Vietnamese national consciousness throughout history. The word Viet/Yue is often used to refer to an ethnic group when it had various meanings throughout history. There was no terminology to describe a Chinese-Vietnamese dichotomy during the Han-Tang period nor was there a term to describe a cohesive group inhabiting the area between the Pearl River and the Red River. According to historians such as Keith W. Taylor, Nguyen Phuong, and John D. Phan, there is no actual evidence that the Đông Sơn culture or figures such as the Trưng sisters were Vietnamese people or ancestors of the Vietnamese. During the Tang period, the indigenous people of Annan or Jinghai Circuit were referred to as the Wild Man (Wild Barbarians), the Li, or the Annamese (Annan people).

In addition, the national history tends to have a narrow view limited to modern national boundaries, leading to conclusions of exceptionalism. Although it is true that the political situation in the Red River Plain was less stable than in Guangzhou to the north, such circumstances were not restricted to the area. The Vietnamese national narrative retroactively assigns any local rebellions, the rise of local dynasties, and their local autonomy with the motive of seeking national independence.

After the second century BC, local administration became more hereditary with greater decentralization of state governance. Catherine Churchman criticized Holmgren and Taylor's characterization of this phenomenon as a form of "semi-independent Vietnamised bureaucracy" when applied to territory covering Vietnam. The same trend was occurring throughout the entirety of the Han dynasty during this period. Moreover, families that Holmgren and Taylor selected as examples of Vietnamization held positions not just in areas that later became Vietnam, but also areas that are part of modern China. Like Shi Xie before them, such families (Tao, Du, Teng) that administered parts of modern Vietnam were also involved in the politics of Guangzhou and other places outside the Red River Plains. Phan and Taylor note that families such as the Du clan that settled in Jiao (northern Vietnam) came from other places in the empire and did not consider Jiao to be their permanent home. When Du Hongwen was summoned by the Liu Song court, he left without complaint, which would have only come as a surprise if Jiao was interpreted as a proto-Vietnam or Du Hongwen himself a "Vietnamese" who forsook his homeland. This sort of anachronistic approach misses the context that Jiao existed within the framework of a broader early medieval China. Later inhabitants of Vietnam during the Tang period such as Jiang Gongfu (731-805) and his brother Jiang Fu, whose family came from Aizhou (Ái), took the civil service exam in 805 and reached high places within the imperial government. Gongfu became a high-ranking member of the Hanlin Academy while his younger brother became a high minister at court. For socio-cultural elites such as these who received imperial appointment, the path to power lay firmly with Sinitic authority.

In the late fifth century, the politics of the Red River Plain did diverge from Guangzhou and the area experienced greater autonomy under the control of powerful local families. However none of them with the exception of Lý Bôn seem to have been interested in becoming the ruler of an independent state. While Lý Bôn declared himself the Emperor of Yue in 544, his initial grievances seem to have arisen from the Liang dynasty's administrative system, in which he found no avenue for advancement. He only declared his emperorship after having failed to obtain official appointment in the Liang court. In Chinese historical texts such as the Book of Qi and Book of Chen, Lý Bôn is neither considered a foreigner or a barbarian but simply another rebel leader spawning from the regional governing elite. The 15th century Đại Việt sử ký toàn thư describes Lý Bôn as the Vietnamized descendant of Chinese refugees fleeing turmoil in the north caused by Wang Mang's usurpation of power. There is no evidence that Lý Bôn's state was any less "Sinitic" than independent kingdoms to the north such as Eastern Wei, Western Wei, Northern Qi and Northern Zhou, all of which were led by non-Sinitic groups. Phan suggests that Lý Bôn may have even represented a more "Sinitic" ruler compared to these northern states because he initially tried to work within the Liang court. Later moves toward autonomy in the 10th century were also not unique, and were fairly tame compared to the activities of people who cushioned them from more direct contact with Southern dynasties empires.

Phan also notes that later Vietnamese kingdoms canonized Mai Thúc Loan, a rebel leader in the 8th century Tang dynasty, in a revisionist project that made local cults orthodoxy. This was despite the fact that Mai Thúc Loan came from the periphery representing diverse but fringe cultural elements including the Chams and Khmers, and therefore neither a "local" of the Red River Plains or "proto-Vietnamese".

==== Military resistance against China ====
According to Xinru Ma and David C. Kang, the portrayal of Vietnam's history as one of constant struggle for independence from China is a "recent, twentieth-century nationalist narrative" that came about during the French colonial period. The narrative of chronic war between Vietnam and China for the sake of autonomy was used to unite the Vietnamese people against imperial powers such as the United States. Ma and Kang describe this historical framework as a "meme" that is often repeated uncritically even in modern research on relations between Vietnam and China.

Similarly, Tuong Vu calls the nationalist framework for historical China-Vietnam relations "seriously misleading" and criticizes it as simplistic, reducing complex relations to a one dimensional narrative of domination and resistance that exaggerates the importance of Vietnam to China as well as overlooking Vietnam's own expansionist initiatives. Despite serious shortcomings to the nationalist narrative, it has become extremely prevalent as a result of popularization due to the wars against France and the U.S. as well as Vietnam's location at the periphery of China lending it an air of reality. While recent scholarship has challenged the standard narrative, it is "still preoccupied with dyadic Sino-Vietnamese interactions in which China and Vietnam are taken out of their broader geopolitical contexts and juxtaposed as opposites". Vu argues that rather than China being the primary opponent of Vietnam throughout history, it was other groups on the southern frontier such as Lâm Ấp or Champa that endangered Vietnam's existence even during the era of Chinese rule. Ma and Kang believe that based on the historical record, rulers of Đại Việt were usually more concerned with internal stability than military conflict with China.

China's political center was too far from its southern frontier to be as concerned with Vietnam as the north. When the Qin dynasty first reached the Red River Delta, they ruled the area indirectly. By the time the Han dynasty established control in 111 BC, most of the ancestors of the Vietnamese people still lived in the upland areas northwest of the Red River. The government was based around modern Hanoi where over time, the Han intermarried with the locals, creating a Han-Viet group that spoke Annamese Middle Chinese along with a language called Proto-Viet-Muong that was prevalent among the lowland population. The significance of this is that the people of the Red River area did not have a single identity or language and often imperial rule meant protection from other groups. Sometimes rebellions such as the uprising of Mai Thúc Loan or Nanzhao's invasion resulted in heavy plundering and destruction for the natives despite their alliance. Many of the rebellions and de facto independent states like the ones created by Zhao Tuo, Lữ Hưng, Lương Thạc, and Lý Bí were led by people of Han or Han-Viet descent with connections to the imperial government. It is impossible to know what their motivations were other than that opportunism was certainly a factor. Vu suggests that these Han-Viet elite families rose up to defend themselves in times of imperial decline rather than seek independence, and in the case of Ngô Quyền, his opponent was not the "Chinese" as a whole but another regional warlord state led by Liu Yan. Following Ngô Quyền, every Vietnamese dynasty spent more time in conflict with people to their south and west than with China.

Keith W. Taylor has also criticized the narrative of Vietnamese resistance against China. Taylor states that rebels during the "thousand years of Chinese domination" were usually ambitious imperial commanders rather than "indigenous" leaders, and the period of Chinese rule was generally a time of prosperity for northern Vietnam. The framing of "Chinese aggression" in the last thousand years covering seven instances of Chinese military conflict with Vietnam do not fit neatly into the category of "aggression". Early conflicts in the post-independence period between Vietnamese and Chinese dynasties such as Ngô Quyền and Southern Han or the Lê dynasty and the Song fit within an already existing paradigm. When Ngô Quyền defended himself against the Southern Han, he did just as any other ruler in China would after the breakdown of imperial order. In 980, when the Song attempted to conquer Đại Cồ Việt, it was doing no more than trying to restore imperial borders, the same that previous dynasties had done for centuries. In the 1070s, it was Đại Việt that attacked the Song. When the Mongol-led Yuan dynasty attacked Đại Việt, many Chinese refugees from the Song fought on the side of the Vietnamese. Most of the following conflicts involving China and Vietnam were in response to appeals for intervention by Vietnamese leaders. The Ming occupation ended not only with their withdrawal but also a civil war between the more sinicized Vietnamese population in the Red River plain and the less sinicized population in the south (Muong people), after which followed a 350 year period of peace between Vietnam and China. Moreover both the Qing and PRC conflicts with Vietnam were limited in scope. Taylor argues that Sino-Vietnamese relations were largely peaceful and that conflict between Vietnamese people was far more common than with any foreign power.

Jaymin Kim criticized the framing of the Qing-Viet conflict in 1788–1789 as yet another attempt by "China" to annex an independent "Vietnam", which emphasizes the heroic Vietnamese resistance against China and obscures the agency of the Qing-allied Lê dynasty. According to Vietnamese sources, the governor-general Sun Shiyi advocated to the Qianlong Emperor for a military expedition to reclaim the former Chinese territory of Annan (Vietnam during the Tang dynasty). However, Kim notes that no Chinese source contains a statement by Sun explicitly advocating for annexation and it is unlikely that the authors of the Vietnamese sources had access to Sun's communications with the Qing emperor, which were secret memorials intended only for the emperor. In addition, the Lê loyalists actively lobbied the Qing court to launch a campaign against the Tây Sơn rebels. Six Lê officials provided the Qing court with tailored and selective information that exaggerated the amount of popular support for the Lê royal family while the last Lê emperor, Lê Chiêu Thống, directly asked the Qing for intervention. The resulting Qing campaign consisted of mostly Qing soldiers, but the Lê loyalists, while small in number also played an important role. Nguyễn Đình Mai, one of the six officials who accompanied the Lê royal family into Qing territory, led the vanguard at the head of a contingent of Lê loyalists. When news of the Qing-Lê alliance reached Vietnam, it received significant support, especially in the north. A number of Vietnamese leaders joined the Qing-Lê alliance, resulting in early successes for the allied army. After the alliance was defeated, the Lê loyalists continued to lobby for further intervention in the Qing dynasty. These Lê refugees and war proponents became a problem for the Qing after it recognized the Tây Sơn dynasty as the rightful successors to the Lê, and the refugees were integrated into the army, forcibly settled in Qing territory, or returned to Vietnam.

==== Cultural resistance against China ====
Researchers such as Liam C. Kelley and Nhi Hoang Thuc Nguyen have criticized the idea that Vietnam was culturally opposed to China. According to Kelley, early studies of Vietnam and China's relationship presented Vietnam as a "little China", and in response, post-WWII research focused on disproving this theory. The result was an opposing and unwavering belief that Vietnam and Vietnamese history were "not Chinese". But as Taylor points out, the educated Vietnamese felt a profound sense of connection to the "civilized world we now call East Asia, centered at the imperial court in China", which has been ignored by nationalist historiography.

Nguyen states that "there is little proof of a consistent or extreme Vietnamese hatred for Chinese culture" throughout history and recent scholarship on elite Vietnamese perspectives indicates there was no practical or popular resistance against China. She argued that concept of a long held animosity towards Chinese culture dating back to ancient times was an artificial construction by the Communist Party of Vietnam created through selective pruning of historical accounts to fit their new historical narrative. Recent scholarship on this time period shows that there was no homogeneously defiant Vietnamese mindset towards China's cultural influences. The Vietnamese elites were generally favorable towards Chinese culture and political norms. Kelley conducted a study of poems composed by Vietnamese envoys to China and did not find any hostility held against China. While these diplomatic missions are portrayed in nationalist historiography as cynical efforts to appease China (tributary missions), the study's subjects seem to have been genuinely proud of being part of Sinic civilization. On the whole, Vietnamese elites prior to French colonization considered knowledge of specific Chinese texts to be the equivalent of historical literacy. As late as the 20th century, important Vietnamese literature such as Ho Chi Minh's poem Vọng Nguyệt, which recites the entire history of Vietnam, was written in Classical Chinese. Language researcher Nguyen Thuy Dan states that the majority of the Vietnamese elite up to the 19th century seem to have never written in anything other than Classical Chinese and even criticized attempts to nativise the Chinese script to represent the Vietnamese language. However, Kelley questions whether or not it is useful to have a discrete division between "Chinese" and "Vietnamese" culture. The Vietnamese elites, in particular the envoys to China, did not think of "Chinese culture" as foreign or as belonging to others. While such views cannot be extrapolated for the wider Vietnamese population, Kelley suggests that such deeply entrenched beliefs among the envoys were probably not an outlier.

==== Canonization ====
The postcolonial Vietnamese canonized the mythological prehistory of Vietnam – the Hùng king, Hồng Bàng dynasty, and kingdom of Văn Lang – as historical truth. Trần Huy Liệu made a direct link between the Hùng kings and the formation of the Vietnamese nation, dating the start of Vietnamese resistance to the beginning of their history. The CPV upgraded the status of the Hùng kings from mythical ancestors to the founding fathers of Vietnam. There had already been a long line of support for the Hùng kings as the origin of the Vietnamese nation, but during the reform period, Party leaders started personally attending the Hùng kings' festival and made further use of it as a source of Vietnamese national unity in a time of instability. Vietnamese historian Vũ Đức Liêm calls this "religious nationalism" and characterizes the act as a form of legitimacy building by the CPV.

Several scholars who have scrutinized the origin of the Hùng kings doubt their historicity. The earliest Vietnamese text to mention the Hùng kings, the Đại Việt sử lược, dates to the 13th century, almost two thousand years after the period which they purport to describe. The earlier Chinese text, the 4th century Almanacs of the Outer Territories of the Jiao province, contains similar descriptions of rulers but calls them Lạc instead of Hùng. According to Henri Maspéro, Nguyễn Văn Tố, and Luo Xianglin, the recorded Hùng (雄) may have been a scribal error that mixed it up with Lạc (雒). Cherry notes that even considering the 4th century Chinese text, it was still created 800 years after the period it discusses, and doubts that either Chinese or Vietnamese texts were able to reliably transmit information over such a large span of time. At best they are a window into what Chinese and Vietnamese of their respective eras made of this prehistoric period of Vietnamese history rather than true primary sources. The only true sources for the relevant period are archaeological artifacts that contain information on the level of technology available to the early inhabitants of northern Vietnam, but contain no information about either the Hùng king or the kingdom of Văn Lang.

Previously orthodox views in Vietnamese history were changed to fit a modern nationalist ideology. The rulers of Nam Việt (Nanyue), referred to as the Triệu dynasty (Zhao dynasty), were reclassified as foreigners in modern Vietnamese historiography. While traditional Vietnamese historiography considered the Triệu dynasty to be an orthodox regime, modern Vietnamese scholars generally regard it as a foreign dynasty that ruled Vietnam. The oldest text compiled by a Vietnamese court, the 13th century Đại Việt sử ký, considered Nanyue to be the official starting point of their history. According to the Đại Việt sử ký, Zhao Tuo established the foundation of Đại Việt. However, later historians in the 18th century started questioning this view. Ngô Thì Sĩ argued that Zhao Tuo was a foreign invader and Nanyue a foreign dynasty that should not be included in Vietnamese history. This view became the mainstream among Vietnamese historians in North Vietnam and later became the state orthodoxy after reunification. Nanyue was removed from the national history while Zhao Tuo was recast as a foreign invader.

== Ethnicity ==
=== Việt/Yue ===
Although many historians use the words "Chinese" and "Vietnamese" to describe ethnicity during the period of Vietnamese history from the Han to Tang dynasties, no contemporary texts during this period make this distinction. The word "Viet" or "Yue", and even Lạc (C. Luo), used in national Vietnamese history to identify ethnicity, did not refer exclusively to people from the Red River Delta in northern Vietnam, nor was there a word to describe a cohesive group living in that region. According to Michael Churchman, the "assumption that the Việt/Yue of old Chinese texts are somehow equivalent to the Vietnamese of today is one of the most persistent myths in Vietnamese national history".

Chinese empires used a variety of words denoting "barbaric" peoples according to their cardinal direction. Before the appearance of Yue, Man was used to refer to "Barbarians of the South" and the Yi the "Barbarians of the East". The later Yue was applied to both "southern barbarians" and political entities such as kingdoms or empires (ex. Baiyue and Nanyue). These were broad categories and the people they were used for did not necessarily share a similar ethnicity. As pre-modern empires, the Chinese dynasties from the Han to the Tang referred to its inhabitants as either "people" (ren) or "subjects" (min). People who lived beyond direct imperial rule or had social political norms different from the imperial heartlands were given special names connoting their "barbarity". For example, during the Tang period, the indigenous people of Annan or Jinghai Circuit were referred to as the Wild Man (Wild Barbarians), the Li, or the Annamese (Annan people). However words for "Chinese" and "Vietnamese" are absent.

Unlike the other terms for "barbarian", Yue did not carry any intrinsically negative connotations and it went out of fashion as a term for "barbarian", transforming into a political designation. After the rise of Nanyue, the name Yue became a local symbol of historical legitimacy around the Pearl River region. The title of Nanyue was revived again in the sixth century when Lý Bôn declared himself the Emperor of Yue in 544. While Chinese sources only mention that he was called "Emperor of Yue", both the Đại Việt sử ký toàn thư and Đại Việt sử lược state that he declared himself "Emperor of Nan Yue". Churchman argues that this is an indicator that Lý Bôn was not drawing on pre-Han symbols of authority since Việt/Yue was rooted in the Chinese geopolitical imagination.

The use of Việt/Yue as a title did not imply ethnicity. The Book of Qi and Book of Chen both describe Lý Bôn as another rebel leader spawning from the regional governing elite rather than a barbarian or a foreigner. The Đại Việt sử ký toàn thư describes Lý Bôn as the Vietnamized descendant of Chinese refugees. The differentiation between civilized and barbarian was also not an immutable characteristic determined by ethnicity. In several cases, Tang writers considered distinguished lineages in the Pearl River region to have become "barbarian" chieftains rather than governors or magistrates. The name Yue continued to be used as a political title during the Tang dynasty. Feng Ang, a powerful local ruler along the southern coast, was advised to take the title "King of Nan Yue". In 722, Feng Ang's relative Feng Lin did take the title as part of a rebellion to the west of Guangzhou. In 917, Liu Yan, the founder of Southern Han, also called his state "Da Yue", or "Great Yue", the same name as Đại Việt. In 926, Wang Yanhan, the ruler of Min, named his kingdom after the historical kingdom of Minyue that existed a thousand years prior. Yue was also used as a name for internal administrative divisions such as multiple Yuezhous. The Yue Province founded in the 470s covered an area that only encompassed Hepu and Leizhou, completely within the boundaries of modern China.

It was common to re-use the names of famous kingdoms in the past and this eventually led to the adoption of the name "Việt" in the Red River region. However, during this period, the name was not only used for political entities outside of modern Vietnam's borders, but also people. In 618, a local leader of Qinzhou named Ning Changzhen received news of the Sui dynasty's fall and pledged allegiance to Xiao Xian, a descendant of the Liang royal house. The governor of Jiaozhi (V. Giao Chỉ) did not recognize Xiao Xian's authority so Ning attacked him, an action which was described as "leading an army of the Hundred Yue to attack Jiaozhou" despite the fact that the attack originated from the northeast of modern Vietnam's borders.

The non-equivalence of the historical Việt/Yue and Vietnamese people is further supported by linguistics. The phonological form of "Việt" used in modern Vietnamese shows that it was borrowed fairly late by its ancestral language. It is pronounced according to a Late Middle Chinese pronunciation from the late Tang period. Combined with the lack of any older self-designation that did not come from a Tang period pronunciation of Classical Chinese, this suggests that the name "Việt" was transmitted through text rather than orally. The adoption of "Việt" as an ethnonym was thus more likely to be political in nature rather than due to a long-held tradition of indigenous ethnic identification.

=== People of Jiaozhi ===
Exonyms for "Viet" people such as Keeu in Tai-Kadai languages and Kuchi in Malay, both of which mean "People of Jiaozhi", indicate that outsiders saw inhabitants of the region as primarily associated with their political status during this period. Both terms originate from Jiaozhi and cannot be traced to any other word in an Austroasiatic language. Kuchi is the origin of Cochin in Cochinchina. Some scholars such as Nguyễn Văn Lợi argue that Jiaozhi is derived from a Kra–Dai word, which implies that the underlying etymology of Jiaozhi is a number of ethnonyms in Southeast Asia, all of which ultimately mean "person" or "people". However historian John Phan notes that there are two main problems with this theory. The first is that the modern Kra–Dai pronunciation is close to the Middle Chinese form of Jiaozhi. The second is that the Proto Kradai form of "people" does not rime with the Middle Chinese form of Jiao. While this does not rule out a Kra–Dai origin since the Kra–Dai could have reborrowed the ethnonym later on from Vietnamese or some form of Sinitic, Phan argues that the pathway from the Kra–Dai word for "people" to the current pronunciations of Jiaozhi is unclear.

There are some records of "men of Jiaozhi" from the 3rd and 5th centuries, but it is uncertain what their ethnicity was. Li Tao and Ding Mo were both recorded to have been "men of Jiaozhi" who were put on record for their extreme displays of filial piety. Li Tao lived by his mother's tomb to construct it by himself while refusing help from neighbors. Ding Mo carried the earth used to build his mother's tomb on his back and planted rows of trees to attract white deer to the area. Huang Hao, another man of Jiaozhi, was stationed as magistrate in Waihuang County (east of modern Anyang in northern China). He was celebrated for his generosity and moderation, and on account of his virtuous rule, he was credited with avoiding a locust plague that afflicted the surrounding area. None of these people were described as barbarians or carrying any specific ethnic marker. Michael Churchman suggests that to Chinese writers, it probably did not matter what their true origins were, so long as they embodied virtues that could be commended and had a similar relationship to the government as people in other parts of the empire.

=== Li and Lao ===
Li (俚) and Lao (獠) were the most common names used during the Han-Tang period to refer to barbarians encompassing the area that is modern Vietnam. The Tang classified certain households in Jiaozhi as "Li households" who only had to pay a special administrative tax at half the rate of normal citizens. However this special status was not restricted to the borders of modern Vietnam and applied to the entire Lingnan region. Li people could be found further north of Guangzhou and as far east as Chaozhou, making it unlikely to be a unified ethnic group. Michael Churchman suggests that "Li" was a term for a mild degree of barbarity in lowland dwellers whereas the "Lao" were highland dwellers closer to imperial administrative centers. Lý Phật Tử, a kinsman of Lý Bôn, was considered a "Li person" despite the fact that Lý Bôn was not according to Chinese historical texts, and the Đại Việt sử ký toàn thư described him as the Vietnamized descendant of Chinese refugees.

=== Đông Sơn culture ===
A material culture known as the Đông Sơn culture existed in northern Vietnam prior to the Han conquest and colonization of the Red River region, but the modern ethnic identification of the ancient material culture is disputed. Some historians and archaeologists believe that they were ancestors of the Vietnamese people based on linguistic evidence while others believe that there is not enough evidence to prove that they were culturally related to the Vietnamese or any other culture. While it is plausible that they were Vietic speakers, it is also plausible that some or a small portion of them were, or that they spoke other Austroasiatic languages, or a combination of different languages. Material evidence of the Đông Sơn culture is not exclusive to Vietnam and has been found in places such as Malaysia and the Chinese provinces of Fujian and Yunnan, probably representing several distinct ethnolinguistic groups who traded with each other. The Đông Sơn culture is closely related to the Dian culture in Yunnan, which has led some to believe that they are variants of one culture or that they are one culture given different names based on the nationality of the researcher. There are no textual records from the Đông Sơn culture and the earliest detailed records on pre-Han polities in Vietnam such as the one based around Cổ Loa Citadel and An Dương Vương do not occur until the 6th century AD in China and over a millennium later in Vietnam.

Evidence of the Đông Sơn material culture disappeared in Vietnam following the Trưng sisters' defeat by the Han dynasty general Ma Yuan in the 1st century AD. Subsequently, Han material culture devoid of Đông Sơn influence appeared, which supports the theory that the Trưng sisters represented a failed indigenous uprising that marked the beginning of more intense Han rule over the region. More than 120 Han brick tombs in the Red River region suggests growing Han migration into the area or cultural influence on the locals by these immigrants. The earliest Sino-Vietnamese loanwords also date from around this time.

=== Vietnamese ethnogenesis ===
There is no recorded endonym for the people living in the Red River plains during this period. All the names used for Vietnamese people today such as Kinh, Việt, and Keeu ultimately derive from the Chinese geographical imagination. Michael Churchman suggests that the people of the Red River plains might have used a name similar to Lạc to refer to themselves and it may have predated the late Tang period. However the name Lạc was also applied to people who lived in Guangxi and is therefore unlikely to consist of a single linguistic group. If the ancestors of the Vietnamese had any self designation for a group identity juxtaposed against their rulers, Churchman surmises that they may have simply called themselves something similar to the modern Vietnamese pronoun ta, meaning "we", "us", or "I". During the colonial era, Nước ta (our country) and tiếng ta (our language) were used in opposition to "western countries" and "western language".

According to Tuong Vu, the people of the Red River area did not have a single identity or language. A number of Vietic languages inhabited the area of modern Vietnam that was under Chinese rule. The Northern Vietic languages (Việt and Mường) were located in Jiaozhi and the Southern Vietic languages (Arem, Ruc, Maleng and Thavung) were located in Jiuzhen and Rinan (V. Nhật Nam). Thavung was spoken in Jiuzhen and the other three languages were spoken in Rinan. Most of the ancestors of the Vietnamese people in the early Han period still lived in the upland areas northwest of the Red River. The government was based around modern Hanoi where over time, the Han intermarried with the locals, creating a Han-Viet group that spoke Annamese Middle Chinese along with a language called Proto-Viet-Muong that was prevalent among the lowland population.

Frederic Pain traces the origin of Vietnamese ethno-genesis to the Han dynasty when northern Vietnam came into contact with an influx of Han settlers. Rather than a primordial culture fighting against foreign encroachment, scholars such as Frederic Pain, Keith W. Taylor, and Michael Churchman now believe that Vietnamese culture came into being during the millennium of Chinese rule. According to Taylor, every aspect of Vietnamese culture unique to it was East Asian in origin and cannot be traced to figures such as the Trưng sisters or the Đông Sơn culture. Historian Nguyen Phuong described the idea that Vietnamese people were descended from the Đông Sơn culture as similar to believing that Americans are descended from the Sioux. While Taylor notes that the Vietnamese language contains more features similar to the native language of northern Vietnam, dubbed Viet-Muong, than English to native North American languages, he concurs that the culture of pre-Han northern Vietnam was completely different from the one known as Vietnamese that emerged centuries later. Historians such as Pain, Taylor, and Churchman subscribe to the idea that Vietnamese culture was the result of interactions between Chinese settlers and the ancestors of Vietnamese people, emerging sometime after the collapse of the Tang dynasty during the 10th century as a distinct culture that was recognizably Vietnamese.

During this period of ethno-genesis, a large number of Chinese people settled in the Red River plain and intermarried with the locals, creating a mixed group that spoke two languages, a prestige language called "Annamese Middle Chinese" and a vernacular language called "Proto-Viet-Muong". The Red River region was relatively peaceful under the protection of the ruling dynasties and prospered, facilitating the rise of a hybridized Vietnamese culture that spoke a sinicised Vietic language. According to Taylor and Henri Maspero, the Nanzhao invasion of Annan (Tang Vietnam) from 854-856 may have been the deciding factor in the split between the Vietnamese ancestors and the Muong people. The Muong allied with Nanzhao whereas the ancestors of the Vietnamese allied with Tang China. When Nanzhao was defeated, the Sino-Vietnamese population saw Gao Pian, the restorer of peace, as a liberator, whereas many of the Muong rebels fled into the mountains. This new culture, based in what was later known as the Đông Kinh (Eastern Capital) region, was steeped in Chinese influence and the prestige of imperial authority. Its elites were a Sino-Vietnamese aristocracy who lived in urban areas and saw neighboring Vietic groups such as the Muong people who inhabited the hilly hinterlands and the Viet people to the south in Thanh Hóa and Nghệ An as inferiors. By the 11th century, these "other" Vietnamese were considered uncivilized savages.

== Language ==
The periods of Chinese rule over Vietnam saw linguistic transformations of several languages in Northern Vietnam, including Thai, Vietnamese, Lao, Muong and many others. These languages are often referred to as a regional sprachbund known as Mainland Southeast Asia linguistic area. Vietnamese and Muong, under heavy linguistic influence from Chinese and Tai-Kadai languages, have completed tonogenesis, monosyllabicization, and grammaticalization of Chinese loan words to become classifiers and aspect markers; while at another extreme, the Southern Vietic languages have robustly polysyllabic morphemes and derivational or inflectional morphology much like conservative Austroasiatic languages. Modern linguists describe modern Vietnamese having lost many Proto-Austroasiatic phonological and morphological features that original Vietnamese had.

A number of languages inhabited the area of modern Vietnam that was under Chinese rule during the Han-Tang period. The Northern Vietic languages (Việt and Mường) congregated in Jiaozhi (V. Giao Chỉ) while the Southern Vietic languages (Arem, Ruc, Maleng and Thavung) were located in Jiuzhen (V. Cửu Chân) and Rinan (V. Nhật Nam). Thavung was spoken in Jiuzhen and the other three languages were spoken in Rinan.

The ancestor of the Vietnamese language received heavy influence from Chinese during the millennium of close contact under Chinese dynastic rule. According to linguist John Phan, the immediate ancestor of the Vietnamese language, known as Proto-Viet-Muong (Northern Vietic), received influence from an "Annamese Middle Chinese" (AMC) dialect that was spoken in the Red River Valley by the 1st century CE. The fusion of vocabulary between the two languages during the Han-Tang period resulted in a split from Muong and the emergence of the Vietnamese language. The proto-Vietnamese language emerged during the period of self rule after the Tang period. In urban areas where the Sino-Vietnamese aristocracy ruled, the influence of AMC diminished, and it was replaced by a sinicized proto-Vietic dialect that became the proto-Vietnamese language. The assimilation of Chinese loan words, known as the Sino-Vietnamese vocabulary, continued after Vietnam became independent, making up a third to 70 percent of the Vietnamese vocabulary.

During Chinese rule from 111 BC to 905 AD, Chinese characters were used as the official writing system of the region. Local texts written in Chinese probably also included some characters adapted to represent Proto-Viet-Muong sounds, usually personal names or Vietic toponyms that had no Chinese equivalent. According to some scholars, the adoption of Chinese characters (chữ Hán or Hán tự) was started by Shi Xie (137–226), but many disagree. Possibly even a thousand years earlier, in the late first millennium BC, Baiyue elites in what is now southern China may have already adopted a form of writing based on Chinese characters to record terms from their own languages. Chinese characters are called a number of names in Vietnamese, including chữ Hán (𡨸漢), chữ Nho (𡨸儒) or Hán tự (漢字, lit. 'Han character'). Chữ Hoa or tiếng Hoa is commonly used to describe Mandarin Chinese, as well as tiếng Tàu for Chinese in general.

By the Tang dynasty period, both the Sino-Vietnamese elite as well as the common folks used Chinese style surnames and personal names. However many of the recorded personal names do not make any sense in Chinese, which indicates they may have been taken from another language such as Vietnamese. The oldest extant poem written in Chinese characters by somebody from Vietnam was authored in 815 by Liêu Hữu Phương. Liêu had made the journey to the Tang dynasty capital of Chang'an to take the civil service examinations and failed, an ordeal which he described in his poem, now preserved in the Complete Tang Poems. He passed the examination in the following year and received an official appointment. By the time Vietnam became independent in 938, Classical Chinese had become the official writing system of Vietnam without any consideration that it was a Chinese language. The Nam quốc sơn hà, a patriotic Vietnamese poem attributed to the Vietnamese general Lý Thường Kiệt (1019–1105), was said to have been read aloud as inspiration to Viet troops before they fought victoriously against the Chinese during the Song–Đại Việt war. The poem was written in Classical Chinese. It is unknown when exactly knowledge of Chinese texts became widespread in Vietnam, but a Song dynasty envoy who reached Vietnam in 987 recounts that when he recited a poem by Tang poet Luo Binwang (ca. 619–684?), a local monk interrupted and sang the last couplet of the poem. This also suggests that the pronunciation of Vietnamese was at that time quite similar to the Late Middle Chinese language spoken by the Song envoy.

Phan notes that Annamese Middle Chinese did not immediately disappear in Vietnam after the end of Chinese rule and rulers such as Ngô Quyền, the Lý dynasty, and other clans originating from the Red River Plain likely all spoke it to a large degree. AMC was a dialect unique to the Red River Plain that developed over generations with features setting it apart from other variations of Chinese. Phan suggests that AMC continued to be spoken in the region for several hundred years after the end of Chinese rule due to the continued leadership of clans who spoke the dialect. It gradually eroded in influence due to a number of factors such as changing leadership originating from the periphery of the Sinitic speaking Red River heartland and the lack of continued migration from areas to the north that spoke Sinitic languages. Over multiple generations, AMC declined while Ancient Northern Vietic (ANV) rose in prominence until the elites only spoke the dialect of ANV that became the proto-Vietnamese language. It is unknown when exactly AMC died out and was replaced by ANV, but there are several references to vernacular speech by the late 14th century, and Nguyễn Quang Hồng suggests that chữ Nôm, the adaptation of Chinese characters to write vernacular Vietnamese, appeared as early as the 12th century. While these do not prove the complete disappearance of AMC, it is clear from references to vernacular language that the predominant spoken language had shifted to ANV by the 14th century.

Texts in Classical Chinese produced in Vietnam were at first indistinguishable from contemporaneous Classical Chinese works produced in China, Korea or Japan. These include the first poems in Classical Chinese by the monk Khuông Việt (匡越), the Nam Quốc Sơn Hà (南國山河), and many Confucian, Daoist, and Buddhist scriptures. Even after the invention of chữ Nôm, educated men were still expected to have a good understanding of chữ Hán and to be able to compose poetry in it. Nguyễn Trãi (1380–1442) composed poetry in both writing systems. This familiarity with poetry in Chinese enabled Vietnamese envoys to communicate with envoys from as far away as Korea.

Chinese writing, or Chữ Hán, was officially instituted as the writing system of the court in 1010 and 1174. As the administrative language of the court and literati, it was also used in the Confucian court examination system in Vietnam. Mastery over the Chinese language continued to define the Vietnamese literati elite until the mid-19th century during French colonial rule when the traditional writing system was abolished in favor of transliterated chữ quốc ngữ.

== Periods of Chinese rule ==
The four periods of Chinese rule in Vietnam:

Period of Chinese rule	Chinese dynasty	Year	Description
First Era of Northern Domination 北屬𠞺次一; Bắc thuộc lần thứ nhất	Western Han dynasty Xin dynasty Eastern Han dynasty	111 BC–AD 40	The first period of Bắc thuộc is traditionally considered to have started following the Western Han's victory in the Han–Nanyue War. It ended with the brief revolt of the Trưng sisters.
Second Era of Northern Domination 北屬𠞺次𠄩; Bắc thuộc lần thứ hai	Eastern Han dynasty Eastern Wu dynasty Western Jin dynasty Eastern Jin dynasty Liu Song dynasty Southern Qi dynasty Liang dynasty	AD 43–544	Chinese rule was restored after the Trung sisters' rebellion. The second period of Chinese rule was ended by the revolt of Lý Bôn, who took advantage of the internal disorder of the waning Liang dynasty. Lý Bôn subsequently founded the Early Lý dynasty, with the official dynastic name "Vạn Xuân" ( 萬春).
Third Era of Northern Domination 北屬𠞺次𠀧; Bắc thuộc lần thứ ba	Sui dynasty Tang dynasty Wu Zhou dynasty Southern Han dynasty (sometimes counted)	AD 602–905 or AD 602–939	The Sui dynasty reincorporated Vietnam into China following the Sui–Early Lý War. This period saw the entrenchment of mandarin administration in Vietnam. The third period of Chinese rule concluded following the collapse of the Tang dynasty and the subsequent defeat of the Southern Han armada by Ngô Quyền at the Battle of Bạch Đằng. Ngô Quyền later proclaimed the Ngô dynasty.
Fourth Era of Northern Domination 北屬𠞺次四; Bắc thuộc lần thứ tư	Ming dynasty	AD 1407–1428	Vietnam was brought under the control of China following the Ming dynasty's defeat of the short-lived Hồ dynasty. The fourth period of Chinese rule ended when the Lam Sơn uprising led by Lê Lợi emerged successful. Lê Lợi then reestablished the Đại Việt kingdom ( 大越) under the new Lê dynasty.

== Census data ==
Year	Chinese dynasty	Period	Households	Population
2	Han dynasty	First Era of Northern Domination	143,643	981,755
140	Han dynasty	Second Era of Northern Domination	64,776 (Note: The 140 census for the Hong River Delta did not survive.)	310,570
	Jin dynasty	Second Era of Northern Domination	25,600	-
	Liu Song dynasty	Second Era of Northern Domination	10,453	-
609	Sui dynasty	Third Era of Northern Domination	56,566	-
ca. 700	Wu Zhou dynasty	Third Era of Northern Domination (Protectorate General to Pacify the South)	38,626 (Note: The census for Phuc Loc, Luc, Truong and Dien counties did not survive.)	148,431
740	Tang dynasty	Third Era of Northern Domination (Protectorate General to Pacify the South)	75,839 (Note: The census for Phuc Loc county did not survive.)	299,377
807	Tang dynasty	Third Era of Northern Domination (Protectorate General to Pacify the South)	40,486	(Note: Information pertaining to the population size in the census did not survive.)
1408	Ming dynasty	Fourth Era of Northern Domination	-	5,200,000 (Note: Ming Shilu Southeast Asia in the Ming Shi-lu: an open access resource)
1417	Ming dynasty	Fourth Era of Northern Domination	450,288	1,900,000

== See also ==
- China–Vietnam relations
- Chinese expansionism
- Sinicization

== Sources ==
- Cherry, Hayden (2009), "Digging Up the Past: Prehistory and the Weight of the Present in Vietnam", Journal of Vietnamese Studies, 4: 84–144, doi:10.1525/vs.2009.4.1.84
- Churchman, Michael (2010), "Before Chinese and Vietnamese in the Red River Plain", Chinese Southern Diaspora Studies, 4
- de Crespigny, Rafe (2007), A Biographical Dictionary of Later Han to the Three Kingdoms, Brill
- DeFrancis, John (1977), Colonialism and language policy in Viet Nam, Mouton, ISBN 978-90-279-7643-7.
- Dutton, George E. (2012), Sources of Vietnamese Tradition, Columbia University Press
- Hannas, Wm. C. (1997), Asia's Orthographic Dilemma, University of Hawaii Press, ISBN 978-0-8248-1892-0.
- Kelley, Liam C. (2005), Beyond the Bronze Pillars: Envoy Poetry and the Sino-Vietnamese Relationship, Association for Asian Studies & University of Hawai'i Press
- Kiernan, Ben (2019). Việt Nam: A History from Earliest Time to the Present. Oxford University Press. ISBN 9780190053796.
- Kim, Jaymin (2023), "The Rise and Fall of a Qing-Lê Alliance, 1788–1804: A Case Study on the Praxis of Sino-Vietnamese Relations", Journal of Vietnamese Studies, doi:10.1525/vs.2023.18.3.98
- Kornicki, Peter (2017), "Sino-Vietnamese literature", in Li, Wai-yee; Denecke, Wiebke; Tian, Xiaofen (eds.), The Oxford Handbook of Classical Chinese Literature (1000 BCE-900 CE), Oxford: Oxford University Press, pp. 568–578, ISBN 978-0-199-35659-1
- Li, Yu (2020), The Chinese Writing System in Asia: An Interdisciplinary Perspective, Routledge, ISBN 978-1-00-069906-7.
- Nguyễn, Ðình-Hoà (1997), Vietnamese, London Oriental and African Language Library, vol. 9, John Benjamins, doi:10.1075/loall.9, ISBN 978-90-272-3809-2, S2CID 242457800.
- Maspero, Henri (1912), "Études sur la phonétique historique de la langue annamite: Les initiales", Bulletin de l'École française d'Extrême-Orient, 12: 1–124, doi:10.3406/befeo.1912.2713.
- Pelley, Patricia M. (2002), Postcolonial Vietnam: New Histories of the National Past, Duke University Press
- Vu, Tuong (2016), State formation on China's southern frontier: Vietnam as a shadow empire and hegemon, HumaNetten Nr 37Hösten
- Lockard, Craig A. (2010). Societies, Networks, and Transitions: A Global History To 1500. Cengage Learning. ISBN 978-1-439-08535-6.
- Walker, Hugh Dyson (2012). East Asia: A New History. AuthorHouse. ISBN 978-1-477-26516-1.
- Suryadinata, Leo (1997). Ethnic Chinese As Southeast Asians. Institute of Southeast Asian Studies.
- Eliot, Joshua (1995). Thailand, Indochina and Burma Handbook. Trade & Travel Publications.
- Hoang, Anh Tuấn (2007). Silk for Silver: Dutch-Vietnamese relations, 1637-1700. Brill. ISBN 978-9-04-742169-6.
- Marr, David G. (1984), Vietnamese Tradition on Trial 1920-1945, University of California Press
- Phan, John D (2025), Lost Tongues of the Red River: Annamese Middle Chinese and the Origins of the Vietnamese Language, Harvard University Asia Centre
- Schafer, Edward Hetzel (1967), The Vermilion Bird: T'ang Images of the South, Los Angeles: University of California Press
- Shing, Müller (2004), Archäologie und Frühe Texte, Harrassowitz, ISBN 9783447050609
- Taylor, Keith W. (2010), The Vietnamese Civil War of 1955-1975 in Historical Perspective, Routledge
- Taylor, K.W. (2013), A History of the Vietnamese, Cambridge University Press
- Trần, Khánh (1993). The Ethnic Chinese and Economic Development in Vietnam. Institute of Southeast Asian Studies. ISBN 9789813016668.
- Ms, Cc (2007). The World and Its Peoples: Eastern and Southern Asia - Volume 6. Marshall Cavendish.
- Ooi, Keat Gin, ed. (2004). Southeast Asia: A Historical Encyclopedia, from Angkor Wat to East Timor. ABC-CLIO. ISBN 978-1-576-07771-9.
- Li, Tana (2018). Nguyen Cochinchina: Southern Vietnam in the Seventeenth and Eighteenth Centuries. Cornell University Press. ISBN 978-1-501-73257-7.
- Taylor, Keith Weller (1983), The Birth of the Vietnam, University of California Press, ISBN 978-0-520-07417-0
- Reid, Anthony; Tran, Nhung Tuyet (2006). Viet Nam: Borderless Histories. University of Wisconsin Press. ISBN 978-1-316-44504-4.
- Wang, Zhenping (2013). Tang China in Multi-Polar Asia: A History of Diplomacy and War. University of Hawaii Press.
- Xiong, Victor Cunrui (2009), Historical Dictionary of Medieval China, United States of America: Scarecrow Press, Inc., ISBN 978-0810860537
- Yao, Alice (2017), The Dian and Dong Son Cultures, Springer
