= AD 178 =

178 in various calendars
- Gregorian calendar: 178; CLXXVIII
- Ab urbe condita: 931
- Assyrian calendar: 4928
- Balinese saka calendar: 99–100
- Bengali calendar: −416 – −415
- Berber calendar: 1128
- Buddhist calendar: 722
- Burmese calendar: −460
- Byzantine calendar: 5686–5687
- Chinese calendar: 丁巳年 (Fire Snake); 2875 or 2668 — to — 戊午年 (Earth Horse); 2876 or 2669
- Coptic calendar: −106 – −105
- Discordian calendar: 1344
- Ethiopian calendar: 170–171
- Hebrew calendar: 3938–3939
- Hindu calendars
- Vikram Samvat: 234–235
- Shaka Samvat: 99–100
- Kali Yuga: 3278–3279
- Holocene calendar: 10178
- Iranian calendar: 444 BP – 443 BP
- Islamic calendar: 458 BH – 457 BH
- Javanese calendar: 54–55
- Julian calendar: 178; CLXXVIII
- Korean calendar: 2511
- Minguo calendar: 1734 before ROC 民前1734年
- Nanakshahi calendar: −1290
- Seleucid era: 489/490 AG
- Thai solar calendar: 720–721
- Tibetan calendar: མེ་མོ་སྦྲུལ་ལོ་ (female Fire-Snake); 304 or −77 or −849 — to — ས་ཕོ་རྟ་ལོ་ (male Earth-Horse); 305 or −76 or −848

Year 178 (CLXXVIII) was a common year starting on Wednesday of the Julian calendar. At the time, it was known as the Year of the Consulship of Scipio and Rufus (or, less frequently, year 931 Ab urbe condita). The denomination 178 for this year has been used since the early medieval period, when the Anno Domini calendar era became the prevalent method in Europe for naming years.

== Events ==
=== By place ===
==== Roman Empire ====
- Bruttia Crispina marries Commodus, and receives the title of Augusta.
- Emperor Marcus Aurelius and his son Commodus arrive at Carnuntum in Pannonia, and travel to the Danube to fight against the Marcomanni.

==== Asia ====
- Last (7th) year of Xiping era and start of Guanghe era of the Chinese Han dynasty.
- In India, the decline of the Kushan Empire begins. The Sassanides take over Central Asia.
- In Hepu and Jiaozhi (modern day Northern Vietnam) during the second Era of Northern Domination, a rebellion led Liang Long broke out and last for three years until it was quelled by general Zhu Jun of the Han dynasty.

==== Religion ====
- The Montanist heresy is condemned for the first time.

== Births ==
- Lü Meng, Chinese general (d. 220)
- Peng Yang, Chinese official (d. 214)
- Zhang Cheng, Chinese general (d. 244)

== Deaths ==
- February 12 – Agrippinus, patriarch of Alexandria
- Song, Chinese empress of the Han dynasty
