= Second Era of Northern Domination =

Period of Chinese rule of Vietnam (43–544 AD)

Second Era of Northern Domination Bắc thuộc lần thứ hai 北屬吝次𠄩
- 43–544
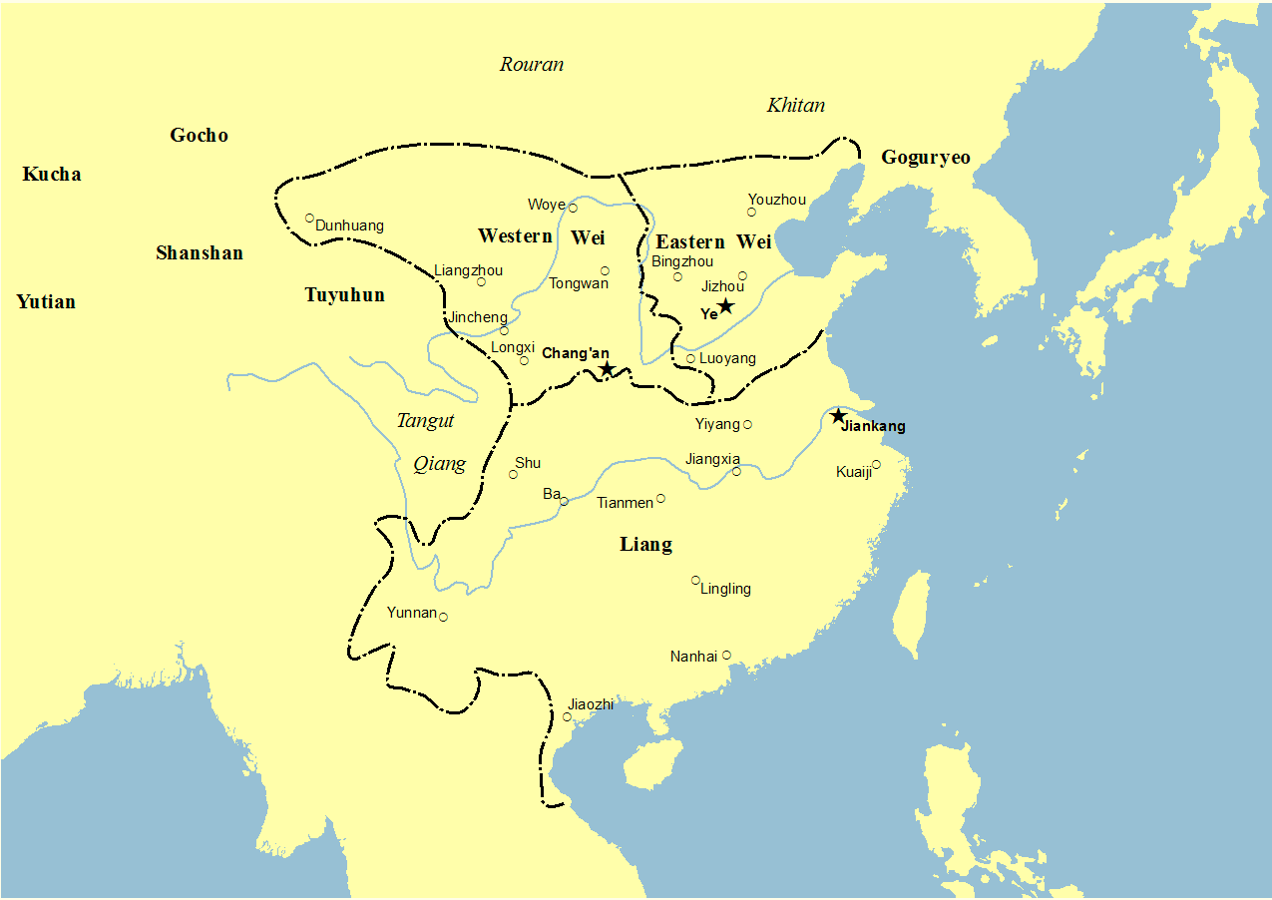
- Map of the Liang dynasty in 502
- Status: Commanderies of the Eastern Han dynasty, Eastern Wu dynasty, Western Jin dynasty, Eastern Jin dynasty, Liu Song dynasty, Southern Qi dynasty, Liang dynasty
- Capital: Long Biên
- Government: Monarchy
- Emperor
  - 43–57: Emperor Guangwu of Han (first)
  - 229–252: Emperor Da of Eastern Wu
  - 266–290: Emperor Wu of Jin
  - 420–422: Emperor Wu of Liu Song
  - 479–482: Emperor Gao of Southern Qi
  - 502–544: Emperor Wu of Liang (last)
- History
  - End of Trung sisters' rebellion: 43
  - Jiaozhi under Eastern Wu: 222
  - Jin dynasty unified China: 280
  - Jiaozhi under Liu Song dynasty: 420
  - Jiaozhi under Southern Qi: 479
  - Jiaozhi under Liang dynasty: 502
  - Lý Bí's rebellion: 544
- Currency: cash coins
Preceded by	Succeeded by
Trưng sisters	Early Lý dynasty
- Today part of: Vietnam; China

The Second Era of Northern Domination refers to the second period of Chinese rule in Vietnamese history, from the 1st century to 6th century AD, during which present-day northern Vietnam (Jiaozhi) was governed by various Chinese dynasties. This period began when the Han dynasty reconquered Giao Chỉ (Jiaozhi) from the Trưng Sisters and ended in 544 AD when Lý Bí revolted against the Liang dynasty and established the Early Lý dynasty. This period lasted about 500 years.

== History ==
=== Eastern Han dynasty ===
After suppressing the Trưng sisters in 43 AD, Ma Yuan continued his crackdown on the Lac Viet resistance and their society. Lac lords who had joined the Trung sisters, who had submitted or surrendered to Ma Yuan would be spared, those who disobeyed were beheaded. Direct imperial government now was imposed on the region for the first time, and Ma Yuan was appointed as Jiaozhi's governor. Some of 20,000 Chinese soldiers had settled in northern Vietnam to help rebuild the Han administration, living along with around 900,000 local people. By the second and third century, local sites and artifacts often contain both Yue and Han styles, include Han-style tomb bricks and Dong Son artifacts such as bronze drums. Evidence from early Chinese loanwords in Vietnamese suggests that Chinese household and agricultural objects, Chinese-style marriage and burial practices, practices of literacy, Iron-Age metals, and aspects of other Chinese-style cultural domains were introduced into indigenous society in the Eastern Han era or earlier. Although the Yue had adjusted local cultures, the Han Chinese didn't force the locals to adopt Chinese customs. From the Han to the Tang era, Imperial Chinese had supported for the political alliances with the locally based Yue political elite, many of which were powerful and wealthy chieftains. The Chinese court often gave them official positions in order to extract profits from them.

After governing Jiaozhi for 3 years, Ma Yuan was recalled in the year 45. During emperor Ming era, Rinan then Jiuzhen were governed by Li Shan who was well known for his benevolent rule. Li Shan was then appointed governor of Jiuzhen, while the governorship of Jiaozhi was succeeded by Zhang Hui. Zhang Hui was later prosecuted for corruption and expelled. His property was confiscated and transferred to the state treasury. Although the exact date is not clearly stated, it can be inferred from the historical source An Nam Chí Lược that Hu Gong succeeded Zhang Hui as governor of Jiaozhi, during the reign of emperor Zhang. However Hu Gong assumed the position of commandant of Jiaozhi (Vietnamese: Đô úy Giao Chỉ), instead of governor. Historical source such as An Nam Chí Lược and Đại Việt sử ký toàn thư contain no records about Jiaozhi from the reign of emperor Zhang in 75 AD to the 130s AD under emperor Shun. However, based on Việt Nam: a history from earliest time to the present, in 100, Cham people in Xianglin (Tượng Lâm) county (near modern-day Huế) revolted against the Han rule due to high taxes. The Cham plundered and burned down the Han centers. The Han respond by putting down the rebellion, executed their leaders and granting Xianglin a two-year tax respite.

In 136, Jiaozhi sitting governor Zhou Chang requested the emperor to classify Jiaozhi as a town, but the request was rejected. Zhou Chang was then appointed as Jiaozhou provincial governor (Vietnamese: Thứ sử Giao Châu), with authority over all its districts. Historical source such as An Nam Chí Lược and Đại Việt sử ký toàn thư contain no further records about Zhou Chang in the year 136 as by the following year 137, Fan Yan was recorded as Jiaozhi governor. In the same year, Cham people led by Sri Mara (Vietnamese: Khu Liên) rebelled in Xianglin, and Fan Yan led an army of over ten thousands troops from both Jiaozhi and Jiuzhen to quell the uprising. However, the army had low morale due to the long marching distance and Fan Yan was defeated by the rebels. Giả Xương, an official was appointed to Rinan to lead the army of other districts and provinces in the region to quell the uprising but failed and was besieged by the rebels for more than one year. In 138, Zhang Qiao, who had just been appointed as Jiaozhou's governor along with the sitting Jiuzhen's governor Zhu Liang successfully made peace with the rebels in Xianglin. History records don't clarify the terms of the peace agreements between the Han dynasty governors and the rebels, so it remains unclear what happened to Sri Mara after that event. While Đại Việt sử ký toàn thư mentions "Sri Mara" as the leader of the uprising, An Nam chí lược states that the rebellion was led by 'barbarians' and does not mention the leader name. Keith W. Taylor's The Birth of the Vietnam (1983) places Sri Mara's uprising in 192, while no Vietnamese or Chinese historical sources record any uprising occurring in Xianglin or Jiaozhi in that year 192. As historical sources date the year Sri Mara declared himself King of Lâm Ấp and founded the kingdom to 192, this has led to the hypothesis that 'Sri Mara' may have been a noble title used by multiple leaders, due to the gap between 138 and 192.

In 144, Cham people again launched another two rebellions which provoked mutinies in the imperial army from Jiaozhi and Jiuzhen, then rebellion in Jiaozhi. Xia Fang, the governor of Jiaozhi, according to Kiernan, "lured them to surrender" with "enticing words." Xia Fang was subsequently appointed governor of Guiyang, while Lưu Tảo succeeded him as governor of Jiaozhi.

In 157, local leader Chu Đạt in Jiuzhen rebelled and killed the Chinese magistrate of Jufeng who was notorious for his greed and cruelty, then marched north with an army of four to five thousand. War broke out between Ni Shi (Vietnamese: Nghê Thức), the governor of Jiuzhen, and the rebels, during which Ni Shi was killed in action. The Han general of Jiuzhen, Wei Lang, gathered an army and defeated Chu Đạt, beheading 2,000 rebels.

In 159 and 161, Indian merchants arrived Jiaozhi and paid tribute to the Han government. Introduced by Indian merchants via sea, by late Han period, Buddhism quickly became the most predominant religion in Northern Vietnam, whereas the Dâu Temple (circa. 2nd century AD) was the first Buddhist temple in Vietnam.

In 160, rebellion broke out one more time in Jiuzhen. Xia Fang, who was now governor of Guiyang, was re-appointed as governor of Jiaozhi. Owing to his influence and benevolent governance during his previous tenure in Jiaozhi in the 140s, Xia Fang easily called the rebels for surrender.

In 166, a Roman trade mission arrived Jiaozhi, bringing "tribute" (from the Chinese perspective) to the Han, which "were likely bought from local markets" of Rinan and Jiaozhi.

In 178, Wuhu people (烏滸) under Liang Long sparked a revolt against the Han in Hepu and Jiaozhi, which Jiaozhi's inspector Chou Yung failed to suppress. Liang Long spread his revolt to all northern Vietnam, Guangxi and central Vietnam as well, attracting all non-Chinese ethnic groups in Jiaozhi to join. In 181, the Han empire sent general Zhu Juan to deal with the revolt, while Nanhai inspector Kong Zhi also led thousands of residents to join Liang Long's revolt. In June 181, Liang Long was captured and beheaded, and his rebellion was suppressed, while the fate of Kong Zhi remains unrecorded. In recognition of his achievements for suppressing the revolt, the Han imperial court enfeoffed Zhu Juan as a Marquis of a Chief Village and summoned him to the imperial capital Luoyang to serve as a Counsellor Remonstrant. Chou Yung remained as Jiaozhi's inspector.

In 183, the local army launched a coup, captured Chou Yung, and subsequently executed him. The military junta then sent an envoy to the Han dynasty to accuse Chou Yung of his crimes. The accusation listed various corrupt governors of Jiaozhi who exploited the region’s resources — such as pearls, rhinoceros horns, ivory, tortoiseshell, rare spices, and valuable timber — to enrich themselves and then apply for reassignment to another post. The military junta also blamed the high taxes and the suppression of their right to file complaints, which they claimed led to the revolt — though they insisted that none of them had originally wanted an uprising. Emperor Ling agreed with the accusation and assigned Jia Cong as Jiaozhi governor. Jia Cong then sent his people throughout the region to offer guidance and encouragement, persuading the rebels to return to their livelihoods. He also reduced taxes and executed corrupt officials, replacing them with benevolent ones. Peace was restored in Jiaozhi, and the residents praised Jia Cong for his just and effective governance. After governing Jiaozhi for 3 years, Jia Cong was recalled to the capital amid the political crisis under Emperor Ling, and was succeeded by Lý Tiến, a native of Jiaozhi. Đại Việt sử ký toàn thư marked this event as the end of Eastern Han domination in Jiaozhi, which had lasted for 144 years (43-186).

=== Three Kingdoms era ===
In 187, Shi Xie (Vietnamese: Sĩ Nhiếp) was appointed governor of Jiaozhi amid the province's crisis during the final years of the Eastern Han dynasty. When China plunged into civil war, Shi Xie ruled Jiaozhi as an independent warlord from 187 until his death in 226. During that time, Shi Xie's younger brothers also held important positions in Jiao Province: Shi Yi (士壹), Shi Wei (士䵋) and Shi Wu (士武) were respectively the Administrators of Hepu (合浦), Jiuzhen (九真) and Nanhai (南海) commanderies in Jiao Province. As being a remote province in southern China, Shi Xie's Jiao was not caught up in the chaos of the Han Empire during its last days. Shi Xie soon proved himself to be a great and benevolent governor, who was deeply respected and even referred to as a 'king' by all the residents. His commanderies also attract hundreds of scholars from the Han dynasty amid the on-going political crisis in the empire.

During the Eastern Wu era, Shi Xie pledged allegiance to Sun Quan forces in 210 and later became a vassal of this empire. Shi Xie also sent his son Shi Xin (士廞) to the Wu to strengthen the allegiance. Shi Xie sent annual tribute to Sun Quan, including thousands of precious rare spices, silk, pearls, ivory and Jiaozhi's fruit to maintain good relations with Eastern Wu. In recognition of Shi Xie's effective governance, Sun Quan appointed him as General of the Guards (衛將軍) and awarded him the title "Marquis of Longbian" (龍編侯). When the Eastern Han dynasty split into the Three Kingdoms in 220, Jiaozhi was under the control of the state of Wu.

Shi Xie died of illness in 226. In that same year, Sun Quan divided Jiaozhi into two separated provinces, Jiaozhou (included northern Vietnam and small portion of Hepu) and Guangzhou. Sun Quan then sent his close aide Chen Shi (陳時) to replace Shi Hui as the Administrator of Jiaozhi Commandery. In 227, upon learning of the territory changes and administrative rearrangement, Shi Hui refused to comply and sent his troops to block Chen Shi's envoy from entering Jiao Province. Shi Hui declared himself prefect of Jiaozhi while his subordinate Huan Lin urged him to capitulate to Chen Shi and the Wu. This infuriated Shi Hui and he had Huan Lin flogged to death. Following that, Huan Lin's brother Zhi and his son, Huan Fa (桓發) launched a mutiny against Shi Hui which results in a battle lasted for a few months. They made peace after that. Upon learning of Shi Hui's rebellion, Sun Quan ordered Lü Dai, the Inspector of Guang Province, to lead troops to take over Jiao Province. Lü Dai was a close friend of to Shi Kuang (士匡), a son of Shi Xie's brother Shi Yi (士壹) and Shi Hui's cousin. Taking advantages of this relationship, Lü Dai assessed the situation with Shi Kuang then sent him to persuade Shi Hui to surrender, promising that he would be spared if he did so. Shi Hui agreed and, together with his brothers, opened the Jiaozhi Commandery's gates to surrender to Lü Dai. The following day, Lü Dai invited the Shi brothers to a banquet where he captured them. Lü Dai read out a list of Shi Hui's crimes and then executed them, sending their heads to Sun Quan, ending Shi rule in Jiaozhi. Lü Dai then became the governor of Jiaozhou. Sometime between 227 and 231, Shi Xin—the only surviving son of Shi Xie, who was held in Wu as a hostage to secure allegiance—died. Gan Li and Huan Zhi, generals under Shi Hui, rebelled against Lü Dai and were defeated. The Wu then dissolved Guangzhou and restored Jiaozhi as before. Lü Dai then launched an operation against Jiuzhen which resulted in the death of tens of thousands of civilians and the capture of many prisoners of war.

In 231, seeing that Jiaozhi was no longer a security threat to the Wu, Lü Dai was recalled to court. In that same year, Hepu governor Xue Song submitted a petition to Sun Quan, analysing that the southern regions of the empire still posed a threat to national security. Sun Quan agreed and re-assigned Lü Dai as the governor of Jiaozhi, with the title of "Marquis of Paungoo" (Phiên Ngung hầu). Lü Dai was known as an incorruptible governor, and also a workaholic who work so much that he completely ignored his wife and children to live in poverty and hunger. After Sun Quan found out, he provided money, grain, cloth and silk to Lü Dai's family annually as welfare.

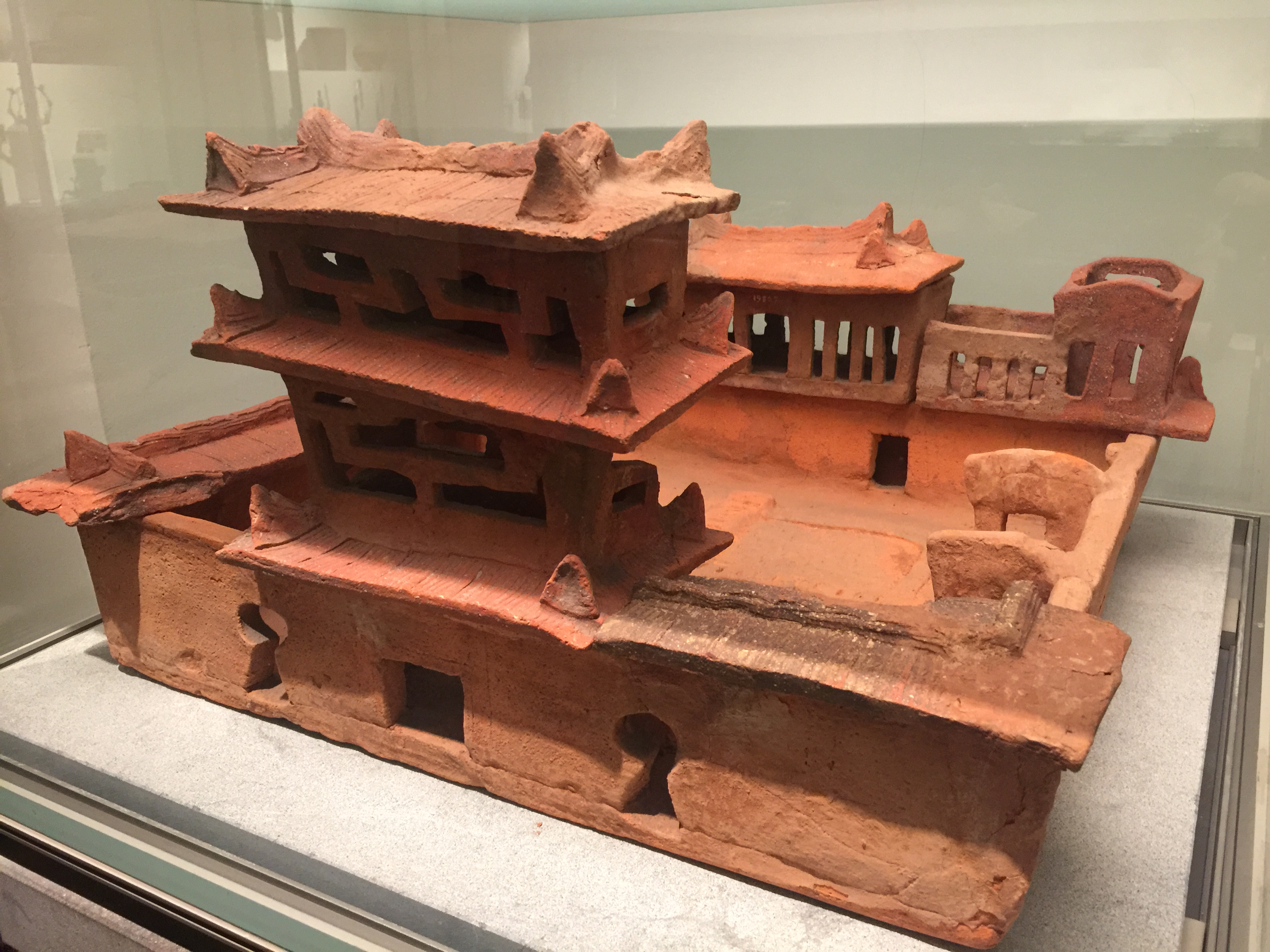
Han style funerary house model found in Bỉm Sơn, Thanh Hóa. 1st-3rd century AD

Notwithstanding the positive accounts of Lü Dai, the Wu regime was harsh since its rule in 231. In 248, Lâm Ấp forces invaded from the south, seized most of Rinan, and marched on into Jiuzhen, provoking major uprisings there and in Jiaozhi. In Jiuzhen, a Lạc Việt woman named Triệu Ẩu (Lady Triệu) led a rebellion against the Wu in the same year, but was suppressed by Lu Yin.

=== Jin-Wu war ===
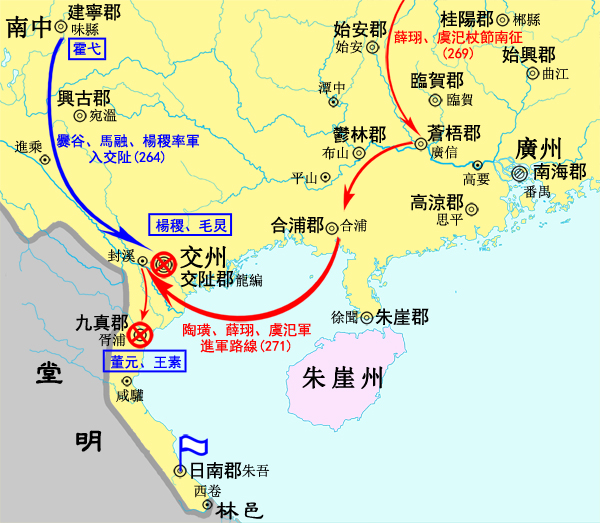
Jin–Wu war， 264–272

In 263, Lü Xing (呂興), the prefect of Jiaozhou, gained support from local people and soldiers, murdered Wu administrators Sun Xu (孫諝) and Deng Xun (鄧荀), then sent envoys to Cao Wei requesting military assistance. Jiaozhi, Jiuzhen and Rinan were transferred to Wei. In February 266, Western Jin replaced Cao Wei, immediately sent Yang Chi to annex Jiaozhou with local supports. In 268, Wu sent two generals, Liu Chun and Xiu Ze to reconquer Jiaozhou, but were repelled by Jin armies. In 270, Jin and Wu armies clashed in Hepu. The Wu general, Tao Huang contacted with Luong Ky, a local commander collaborating with the Jin and convinced him to side with the Wu, enabled the Wu army to recapture Jiaozhi's ports and main towns in 271. Fighting continued in the countryside until 280, when Jin destroyed Wu, reunifying China. The war devastated the region as number of households in northern Vietnam fell from 64,700 in 140 AD to around 25,600 by the Western Jin dynasty period.

=== Jin dynasty and Southern dynasties ===
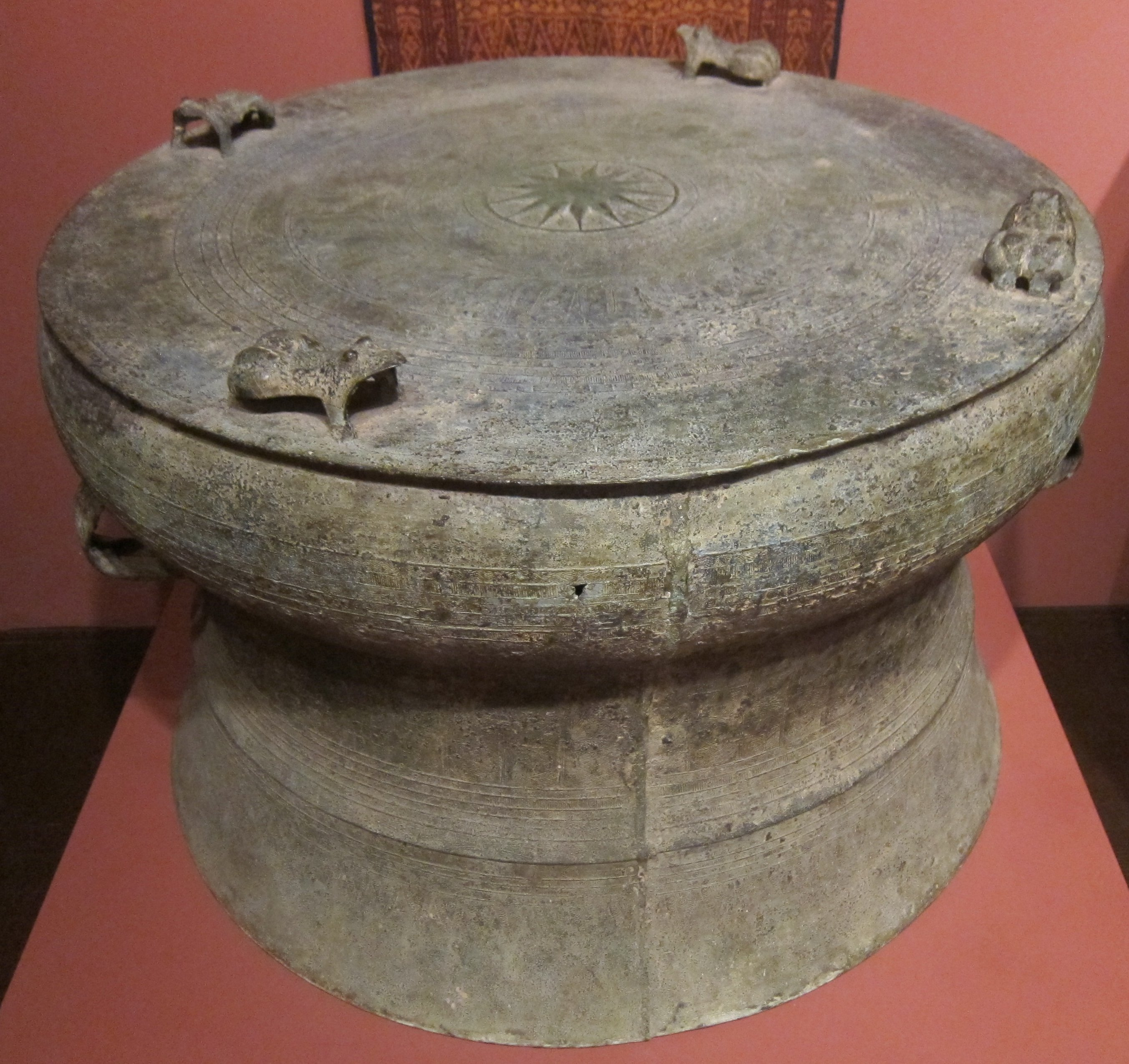
Li Lao drum, 4th century AD, Honolulu Museum of Art

In the early period of Jin dynasty, the imperial court favored the southern trade network with the prosperous kingdoms of Funan and Lâm Ấp. Along with this brief peacetime "boom" in the southern trade, Jiaozhi and Jiuzhen enjoyed some autonomy from China until the 320s. In 312 rebels and imperial army fought each other with ferocity over Jiaozhi and Jiuzhen. Frustrated by the difficulty of trade, Lâm Ấp itself resorted from 323 to seaborne raids on northern ports in Jiaozhou. Though defeated in 399, Lâm Ấp continued its raids on Jiaozhi and Jiuzhen for two decades. A Chinese rebel army from Zhejiang briefly seized Jiaozhi's capital in 411. In 432, Phạm Dương Mại II of Lâm Ấp sent an embassy to the court of Liu Song asking for the appointment of Prefect of Jiao, which was declined.

During the Jin dynasty and Six dynasties period of China, the Li-Lao people extended their territories right along the south coast of modern Guangdong and Guangxi, in a swath of land to the east of the Red River Delta and south and west of the Pearl River Delta, occupied the overland roads between Guangzhou and Jiaozhou. The people of Li-Lao country put anyone traveled through their territories in dangers.

Rebellions broke out in Jiaozhou from 468 to 485 against the Southern dynasties, and in 506 and 515 under Liang dynasty. In March 468 under the Liu Song dynasty, Jiaozhou governor Liu Mu died of illness. Lý Trường Nhân, a nobleman, along with his younger cousin Lý Thúc Hiến launched a coup d'état against the Jiaozhou government, killed the Liu Song officials in Jiaozhou, seized control of the citadel then declared himself as the governor. Awaring of the uprising in Jiaozhou, Emperor Ming of Song, in August of that year, appointed Liu Bo as governor of Jiaozhou, along with an army to retake Jiaozhou from Lý Trường Nhân. After landing in Jiaozhou, Liu Bo was quickly defeated by Lý Trường Nhân, and died shortly afterward. In November of that year, Lý Trường Nhân sent an envoy to make peace with the Liu Song and requested the title of "Hành Châu sự" (Xingzhoushi), a position with less authority than that of the Governor of Jiaozhou. Emperor Ming approved with Trường Nhân's request, granting him the authority to govern Jiaozhou. Lý Trường Nhân governed Jiaozhou until the final days of the Liu Song dynasty, during which he died around the year 479.

In 479, after the death of Lý Trường Nhân, Lý Thúc Hiến requested the Liu Song to be appointed as Trường Nhân's successor. The Liu Song rejected Thúc Hiến's request and appointed Shen Huan, the governor of Nanhai Commandery, as the new governor of Jiaozhou, while Thúc Hiến was assigned to govern Wuping and Xinxing. However, with strong support from the local population, Thúc Hiến deployed troops throughout the region, preventing Shen Huan from assuming office in Jiaozhou. As a result, Shen Huan was forced to remain in Yulin Commandery during the turbulent final days of the Liu Song dynasty, where he eventually died. In 479, the Liu Song fell and the Southern Qi dynasty began southern China. In July, emperor Emperor Gao of Southern Qi granted permission for Lý Thúc Hiến to continue his rule over Jiaozhou as its state governor. In 484 under Emperor Wu of Southern Qi, Lý Thúc Hiến refused to pay tribute to the Southern Qi which angered the emperor and led him to prepare for an annexation campaign the following year. In 485, Emperor Wu appointed Liu Kai as Jiaozhou's governor and mobilized troops from the states of Nankang, Luling, and Shixing to launch a campaign against Thúc Hiến. Fearing a direct confrontation with Liu Kai’s advancing army toward Jiaozhou, Thúc Hiến sent an envoy from Xiangzhou to the Southern Qi to request the withdrawal of troops. During that trip, Thúc Hiến offered tribute consisting of 20 hats made of silver and peafowl feathers, but it was rejected by the emperor. Thúc Hiến then surrendered to the Southern Qi dynasty, officially marking the end of nearly 20 years of Lý clan rule in Jiaozhou.

After the surrender of Lý Thúc Hiến, Liu Kai started governing Jiaozhou from 485 to 490. In 490, Liu Kai was succeeded by Fang Facheng, who was depicted by various historical sources as a "bookworm". In the same year, a state official Fu Dengzhi launched a coup d'etat against Fang Facheng and captured him. Until November of the same year, Fang was replaced by Fu Dengzhi as the new governor. The Đại Việt sử ký toàn thư doesn't clearly specify the exact dates of Fu Dengzhi’s governance in Jiaozhou after he assumed office, but it briefly mentions that Li Yuankai succeeded Fu Dengzhi before the collapse of the Southern Qi in 502. When the Liang dynasty was founded in 502, Li Yuankai was still serving as the governor of Jiaozhou. Until 505, he rebelled against the emperor and was suppressed by Li Ze, a state official, then executed. In 516, Emperor Wu of Lianh appointed Li Ce as Jiaozhou's governor. That same year, Li Ce suppressed the rebellion of Li Zongliao, a former subordinate of Li Yuankai, and brought his head to Jiankang as an offering to the emperor. The exact dates of Li Ce's tenure are unknown but in 541, Hou Zi was serving as governor. Hou Zi was notorious among Jiaozhou's people for his cruelty.

In 541, Lý Bôn, a leader of the Ly clan with Sinitic ancestry, revolted against Hou Zi and the Liang. In 544, he defeated the Liang and proclaimed himself Emperor of Nán Yuè with reign era Thiên-đức. He named the new kingdom "Vạn Xuân" (萬春, "Eternal Spring"). Jiaozhou briefly became independence from the Chinese dynasties. In 545, Chen Baxian led the Liang army attack Jiaozhou, forced Lý Bôn fled west into the mountains above the Red River, where he was killed by Lao highlanders in 548.

== Culture ==
"...In the two districts of Me Linh in Jiaozhi and Do Long in Jiuzhen, when an elder brother dies, a younger brother marries his widow; this has been going on for generations, thereby becoming an established custom, so district officials give in and allow it, not being able to stop it. In Rinan Prefecture, men and women go naked without shame. In short, it can be said that these people are on the same level as bugs."

— Xue Zong, Custom of the South (231)

Due to the political instability of Chinese civilization from 3rd to 6th century, much of the Vietnamese countryside was indirectly ruled, and indigenous Yue customs and relations between the sexes persisted. Women played important roles in indigenous religious rites, including water rituals. International trade through Maritime Silk Road from late AD 100s to 500s brought Dong Son bronze drums from northern Vietnam to far as eastern Indonesia, Papua and the Moluccas. Buddhists from India, known to the Chinese as Hu, had arrived in Vietnam in AD 100s. Buddhism flourished within the region under Shi Xie. In contrast to Confucianism, Buddhism had deep roots in the Vietnamese psyche. Persian and Sogdian merchants also traveled to the Vietnamese coast; the region was the home of Kang Senghui, a Sogdian Buddhist monk who translated Buddhist texts into Chinese.

== Uprisings ==
Local rebellions were organized by:

- Chu Đạt 156–160
- Lương Long 178–181
- Khu Liên 192, who founded the Champa kingdom.
- Lady Triệu 248
- Triệu Chỉ 299–319
- Lương Thạch 319–323
- Lý Trường Nhân and Lý Thúc Hiến 468–485

== See also ==
- Timeline of Vietnam under Chinese rule

Preceded by Trưng Sisters	Dynasty of Vietnam; 43–544	Succeeded by Early Lý dynasty
