= Yue =

Yue or Yueh (/jwɛ/ yweh) may refer to:

== Places ==
- Guangdong, abbreviated 粵 (Yuè), a province of China
- Zhejiang, sometimes abbreviated 越 (Yuè), a province of China
- Yuenan (越南), the Chinese name for Vietnam

== Languages ==
- Yue Chinese, a branch of Chinese, spoken primarily in and around Guangdong and Guangxi
- Cantonese, a dialect of Yue Chinese, widely spoken in Guangzhou, Hong Kong and Macau
- Old Yue language, an extinct language or languages spoken by the Baiyue people of southern China and northern Vietnam.

== People ==
- Cantonese people, or Yue people, a Yue-Chinese speaking ethnic group of China
- Yue (surname), a Chinese surname derived from Mandarin (岳 or 樂) or Cantonese (余)
  - Yue Fei, Song dynasty general
  - Shawn Yue, Hong Kong actor and singer
- Yue, a Chinese given name derived from Mandarin (e.g. 悅, 越, 玥, and 月)

== Historical peoples ==
- Baiyue, an umbrella term for various ancient peoples in coastal southern China
- Shanyue, a tribe residing in the Yue area during the Han dynasty

== Historical states ==
- Yue (state), an ancient state in eastern modern China during the Spring and Autumn period with non-Chinese cultural attributes.
- Minyue, an ancient kingdom located at modern Fujian, a successor to the state of Yue.
- Nanyue, an ancient autonomous Chinese kingdom consisting of modern Guangdong, Guangxi, Yunnan, and northern Vietnam
- Wuyue, a state in modern Zhejiang during the Five Dynasties and Ten Kingdoms period

== Arts and sciences ==
- Yue (钺), a large Chinese axe
- Yue (龠), an ancient Chinese unit of volume
- Yue (籥), an ancient Chinese wind instrument
- Yueqin, a traditional Chinese string instrument
- Yue ware, early Chinese celadon pottery

== Fictional characters ==
- Yue (Cardcaptor Sakura), a character in the anime and manga series Cardcaptor Sakura
- Yue Ayase, a character from the anime and manga series Negima
- Yue Kato, a character in the manga series Angel Sanctuary
- Princess Yue, a character in the television series Avatar: The Last Airbender
- Wellington Yueh, a character from Frank Herbert's Dune universe

== See also ==
- Yueju (disambiguation)
- Yuezhou (disambiguation)
