= Yueju =

Yueju may refer to the following regional Chinese opera genres:

- Yue opera (越剧; 越劇), from Zhejiang and Shanghai
- Cantonese opera (粤剧; 粵劇), from Guangdong

== See also ==
- Henan opera, also called Yuju, a Chinese opera genre from Henan
- Yuediao (越调), a Chinese opera genre also from Henan
- Yue (disambiguation)
