= Yuezhou =

Yuezhou may refer to:

- Yuezhou Town, a town in Qilin District, Qujing, Yunnan, China

== Historical prefectures ==
- Yue Prefecture (Hunan) (岳州), a prefecture between the 6th and 20th centuries in modern Hunan, China
- Yue Prefecture (Zhejiang) (越州), a prefecture between the 7th and 12th centuries in modern Zhejiang, China

== See also ==
- Yue (disambiguation)
