= Liang Long =

Chinese civil revolution leader against Han dynasty (died 181)

Liang Long or Lương Long (died 181) was the leader of a civil revolution in Jiaozhi province (modern-day Northern Vietnam and Guangxi) against the Chinese Eastern Han dynasty rule during the Second Era of Northern Domination in late 2nd century AD.

Liang Long originally was a chief of the Wuhu people (Nùng, Tày people) and was appointed as an official. According to the Book of Later Han, the Wuhu people lived in the area of Hepu and somewhere between Jiaozhou and Guangzhou. In 178, Liang Long started rebelling against the regional Han government, which Jiaozhi's inspector Chou Yung failed to suppress. From Hepu, the revolt spread to the Jiaozhi commandery, and then attracted all of the aboriginal populace in Jiuzhen and Rinan to join. The rebels destroyed the commandery and county offices. In 181, inspired by Liang Long, ten of thousands of residents of Nanhai (Guangdong) led by their inspector Kong Zhi also revolted, occupying several districts.

Liang Long and other rebels threatened Chinese rule across the south. Zhu Jun was appointed as inspector of Jiaozhi and replaced Chou Yung. Zhu was granted 5,000 troops to suppress the rebellion, and marched into Jiaozhi by two routes. He sent spies to districts first to gather information about the rebel forces, propagated to lure the rebels' minds. Then, he mobilized more troops from seven prefectures for the assault. In April 181, Zhu Jun "defeated the rebels, beheaded Liang Long, captured ten thousand men and pacified the rebellion in several weeks."
