= Nanyue =

Kingdom in East Asia (204 BC – 111 BC)

Nanyue 南越 (Chinese) Nányuè Naam4 Jyut6 Nam Việt (Vietnamese) Namz Yied (Zhuang)
- 204 BC–111 BC
- Seal of Emperor Wen

- Location of Nanyue at its greatest extent
- Capital: Panyu
- Common languages: Old Chinese; Baiyue languages
- Ethnic groups: Chinese (Huaxia people); Baiyue Peoples
- Religion: Chinese folk religion local Shamanism
- Government: Monarchy
- Emperor or King
  - 204–137 BC: Zhao Tuo
  - 137–122 BC: Zhao Hu
  - 122–113 BC: Zhao Yingqi
  - 113–112 BC: Zhao Xing
  - 112–111 BC: Zhao Jiande
- Prime Minister
  - 130–111 BC: Lü Jia
- History
  - Qin "War of Pacification": 218 BC
  - Establishment: 204 BC
  - First tribute to Han dynasty: 196 BC
  - Zhao Tuo accession: 183 BC
  - Conquest of Âu Lạc: 179 BC
  - Second tribute to Han dynasty: 179 BC
  - Han conquest of Nanyue: 111 BC

Population
  - 111 BC: 1,302,805
- Currency: Ban Liang
Preceded by	Succeeded by
Qin dynasty; Âu Lạc	Western Han dynasty; First Chinese domination of Vietnam
- Today part of: China; Vietnam

Nanyue

Chinese name
- Chinese: 南越
- Hanyu Pinyin: Nányuè
- Jyutping: Naam4 Jyut6
- Literal meaning: "Southern Yue"
Transcriptions
Standard Mandarin
- Hanyu Pinyin: Nányuè
- Bopomofo: ㄋㄢˊ ㄩㄝˋ
- Gwoyeu Romatzyh: Nanyueh
- Wade–Giles: Nan^{2}-yüeh^{4}
- Tongyong Pinyin: Nányuè
- IPA: [nǎn.ɥê]
Yue: Cantonese
- Yale Romanization: Nàahm Yuht
- Jyutping: Naam4 Jyut6
- IPA: [nam˩ jyt̚˨]
Southern Min
- Hokkien POJ: Lâm-oa̍t
- Tâi-lô: Lâm-ua̍t
Old Chinese
- Baxter–Sagart (2014): *nˤ[ə]m [ɢ]ʷat

Vietnamese name
- Vietnamese alphabet: Nam Việt
- Chữ Hán: 南越

Zhuang name
- Zhuang: Namz Yied

Nanyue (Chinese: 南越 or 南粵; pinyin: Nányuè; Jyutping: Naam4 Jyut6; lit. 'Southern Yue', Vietnamese: Nam Việt, Zhuang: Namz Yied) was an ancient kingdom founded in 204 BC by the Chinese general Zhao Tuo, whose family (known in Vietnamese as the Triệu dynasty) continued to rule until 111 BC. Nanyue's geographical expanse covered the modern Chinese subdivisions of Guangdong, Guangxi, Hainan, Hong Kong, Macau, southern Fujian and central to northern Vietnam. Zhao Tuo, then Commander of Nanhai Commandery of the Qin dynasty, established Nanyue in 204 BC after the collapse of the Qin dynasty. At first, it consisted of the commanderies of Nanhai, Guilin, and Xiang.

Nanyue and its rulers had an adversarial relationship with the Han dynasty, which referred to Nanyue as a vassal state while in practice it was autonomous. Nanyue rulers sometimes paid symbolic obeisance to the Han dynasty but referred to themselves as emperor. In 113 BC, fourth-generation leader Zhao Xing sought to have Nanyue formally included as part of the Han Empire. His prime minister Lü Jia objected vehemently and subsequently killed Zhao Xing, installing his elder brother Zhao Jiande on the throne and forcing a confrontation with the Han dynasty. The next year, Emperor Wu of Han sent 100,000 troops to war against Nanyue. By the year's end, the army had destroyed Nanyue and established Han rule. The dynastic state lasted 93 years and had five generations of monarchs.

The existence of Nanyue allowed the Lingnan region to avoid the chaos and hardship surrounding the collapse of the Qin dynasty experienced by the northern, predominantly Han Chinese regions. The kingdom was founded by leaders originally from the Central Plain of China and were all of Han Chinese in origin. They were responsible for bringing Chinese-style bureaucracy and handicraft techniques to inhabitants of southern regions, as well as knowledge of the Chinese language and writing system. Nanyue rulers promoted a policy of "Harmonizing and Gathering the Hundred Yue tribes" (Chinese: 和集百越), and encouraged ethnic Han to immigrate from the Yellow River region to the south. Nanyue rulers were then not against the assimilation of Yue and Han cultures.

In Vietnam, the rulers of Nanyue are referred to as the Triệu dynasty. The name "Vietnam" (Việt Nam) is derived and reversed from Nam Việt, the Vietnamese pronunciation of Nanyue. In traditional Vietnamese historiography, important works, such as the Đại Việt sử ký, considered Nanyue to be a legitimate state of Vietnam and the official starting point of their history. However, starting in the 18th century, the view that Nanyue was not a legitimate Vietnamese state and Zhao Tuo was a foreign invader started gaining traction. After World War II, this became the mainstream view among Vietnamese historians in North Vietnam and after Vietnam was reunified, it became the official state orthodoxy promoted by the ruling Vietnamese Communist Party. Nanyue was removed from the national history while Zhao Tuo was established as a foreign invader.

== History ==
A detailed history of Nanyue was written in Records of the Grand Historian by Han dynasty historian Sima Qian. It is mostly contained in section (juan) 113, Ordered Annals of Nanyue (Chinese: 南越列傳; pinyin: Nányuè Liè Zhuàn; Jyutping: Naam4jyut6 Lit6 Zyun2). A similar record is also found in the Book of Han Volume 95: The Southwest Peoples, Two Yues, and Chaoxian.

=== Founding ===
==== Qin southward expansion (218 BC) ====
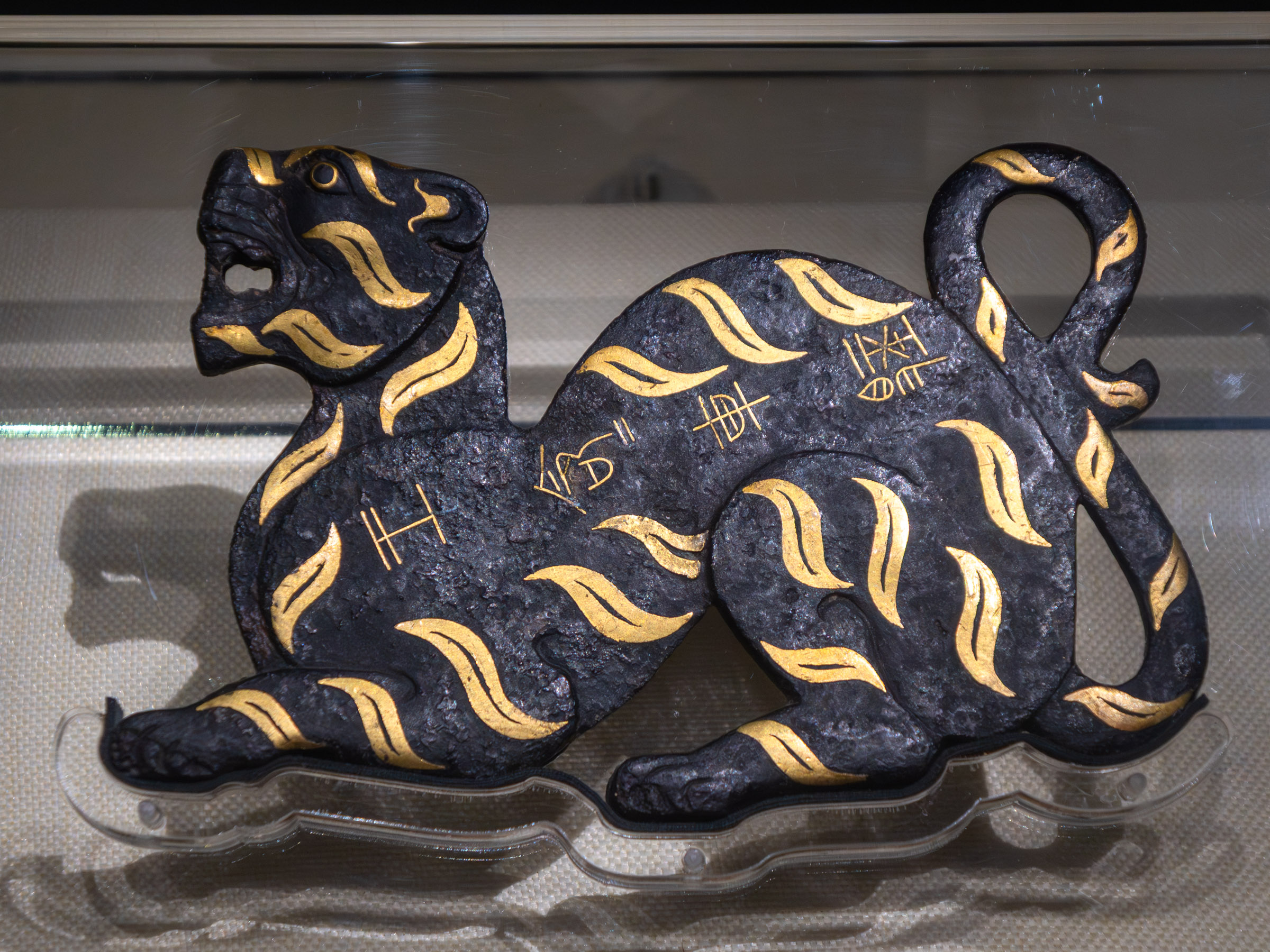
A hufu 虎符, or Tiger Tally, made of bronze with gold inlay, found in the tomb of the King of Nanyue (at Guangzhou), dated 2nd century BCE, during the Western Han era of China; tiger Tallies were separated into two pieces, one held by the emperor, the other given to a military commander as a symbol of imperial authority and ability to command troops.

After Qin Shi Huang conquered the six other Chinese kingdoms of Han, Zhao, Wei, Chu, Yan, and Qi, he turned his attention to the Xiongnu tribes of the north and west and the Hundred Yue peoples of what is now southern China. Around 218 BC, the First Emperor dispatched General Tu Sui with an army of 500,000 Qin soldiers to divide into five companies and attack the Hundred Yue tribes of the Lingnan region. The first company gathered at Yuhan (modern Yugan County in Jiangxi) and attacked the Minyue, defeating them and establishing the Minzhong Commandery. The second company fortified at Nanye (in modern Nankang, Jiangxi), and was designed to put defensive pressure on the southern clans. The third company occupied Panyu. The fourth company garrisoned near the Jiuyi Mountains, and the fifth company garrisoned outside Tancheng (in southwest Jingzhou Miao and Dong Autonomous County, Hunan). The First Emperor assigned official Shi Lu to oversee supply logistics. Shi first led a regiment of soldiers through the Lingqu Canal (which connected the Xiang River and the Li River), then navigated through the Yangtze and Pearl River water systems ensure the safety of the Qin supply routes. The Qin attack of the Western Valley (Chinese: 西甌) Yue tribe went smoothly, and Western Valley chieftain Yi-Xu-Song was killed. However, the Western Valley Yue were unwilling to submit to the Qin and fled into the jungle where they selected a new leader to continue resisting the Chinese armies. Later, a night-time counterattack by the Western Valley Yue devastated the Qin troops, and General Tu Sui was killed in the fighting. The Qin suffered heavy losses, and the imperial court selected General Zhao Tuo to assume command of the Chinese army. In 214 BC, the First Emperor dispatched Ren Xiao and Zhao Tuo at the head of reinforcements to once again mount an attack. This time, the Western Valley Yue were completely defeated, and the Lingnan region was brought entirely under Chinese control. In the same year, the Qin court established the Nanhai, Guilin, and Xiang Commanderies, and Ren Xiao was made Lieutenant of Nanhai. Nanhai was further divided into Panyu, Longchuan, Boluo, and Jieyang counties (among several others), and Zhao Tuo was made magistrate of Longchuan.

Qin Shi Huang died in 210 BC, and his son Huhai became the Second Emperor of Qin. The following year, soldiers Chen Sheng, Wu Guang, and others seized the opportunity to revolt against the Qin government. Insurrections spread throughout much of China (including those led by Xiang Yu and Liu Bang, who would later face off over the founding of the next dynasty) and the entire Yellow River region devolved into chaos. Soon after the first insurrections, Nanhai Lieutenant Ren Xiao became gravely ill and summoned Zhao Tuo to hear his dying instructions. Ren described the natural advantages of the southern region and described how a kingdom could be founded with the many Chinese settlers in the area to combat the warring groups in the Chinese north. He drafted a decree instating Zhao Tuo as the new Lieutenant of Nanhai, and died soon afterward.

After Ren's death, Zhao Tuo, sent orders to his troops in Hengpu Pass (north of modern Nanxiong, Guangdong), Yangshan Pass (northern Yangshan County), Huang Stream Pass (modern Yingde region, where the Lian River enters the Bei River), and other garrisons to fortify themselves against any northern troops. He also executed Qin officials still stationed in Nanhai and replaced them with his own trusted friends.

==== Conquest of Âu Lạc ====
The kingdom of Âu Lạc, which was a merger of Nam Cương (Âu Việt) and Văn Lang (Lạc Việt), lay south of Nanyue in the early years of Nanyue's existence, with Âu Lạc located primarily in the Red River delta area, and Nanyue encompassing Nanhai, Guilin, and Xiang Commanderies. During the time when Nanyue and Âu Lạc co-existed, Âu Lạc acknowledged Nanyue's suzerainty, especially because of their mutual anti-Han sentiment. Zhao Tuo also built up and reinforced his army, fearing an attack by the Han. However, when relations between the Han and Nanyue improved, in 179 BC Zhao Tuo marched southward and successfully annexed Âu Lạc.

==== Proclamation (204 BC) ====
In 206 BC the Qin dynasty ceased to exist, and the Yue peoples of Guilin and Xiang were largely independent once more. In 204 BC, Zhao Tuo founded the Kingdom of Nanyue, with Panyu as capital, and declared himself the Martial King of Nanyue (Chinese: 南越武王, Vietnamese: Nam Việt Vũ Vương).

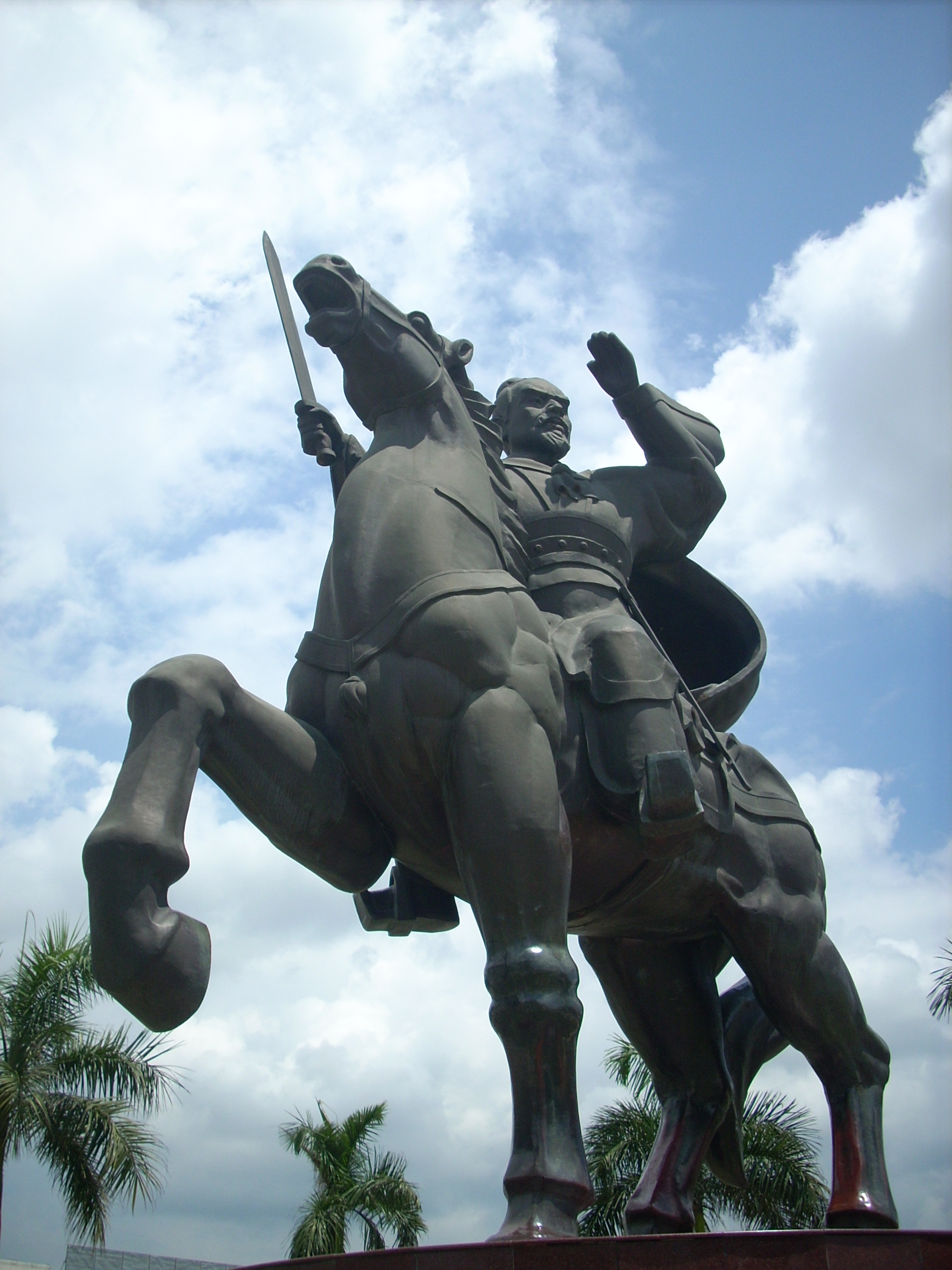
Statue of Zhao Tuo, in front of Heyuan Railway Station

=== Nanyue under Zhao Tuo ===
After years of war with his rivals, Liu Bang established the Han dynasty and reunified Central China in 202 BC. The fighting had left many areas of China depopulated and impoverished, and feudal lords continued to rebel while the Xiongnu made frequent incursions into northern Chinese territory. The precarious state of the empire therefore forced the Han court to treat Nanyue initially with utmost circumspection. In 196 BC, Liu Bang, now Emperor Gaozu, sent Lu Jia (陸賈, not to be confused with Lü Jia 呂嘉) to Nanyue in hopes of obtaining Zhao Tuo's allegiance. After arriving, Lu met with Zhao Tuo and is said to have found him dressed in Yue clothing and being greeted after their customs, which enraged him. A long exchange ensued, wherein Lu is said to have admonished Zhao Tuo, pointing out that he was Chinese, not Yue, and should have maintained the dress and decorum of the Chinese and not have forgotten the traditions of his ancestors. Lu lauded the strength of the Han court and warned against a kingdom as small as Nanyue daring to oppose it. He further threatened to kill Zhao's kinsmen in China proper and destroying their ancestral graveyards, as well as coercing the Yue into deposing Zhao himself. Following the threat, Zhao Tuo then decided to receive Emperor Gaozu's seal and submit to Han authority. Trade relations were established at the border between Nanyue and the Han kingdom of Changsha. Although formally a Han subject state, Nanyue seems to have retained a large measure of de facto autonomy.

After the death of Liu Bang in 195 BC, the government was put in the hands of his wife, Empress Lü Zhi, who served as Empress Dowager over their son Emperor Hui of Han and then Emperor Hui's sons Liu Gong and Liu Hong. Enraged, Empress Lü sent men to Zhao Tuo's hometown of Zhending (modern Zhengding County, Hebei) who killed much of Zhao's extended family and desecrated the ancestral graveyard there. Zhao Tuo believed that Wu Chen, the Prince of Changsha, had made false accusations against him to get Empress Dowager Lü to block the trade between the states and to prepare to conquer the Nanyue to merge into his principality of Changsha. In revenge, he then declared himself the emperor of Nanyue and attacked the principality of Changsha and captured some neighboring towns under Han domain. Lü sent general Zhou Zao to punish Zhao Tuo. However, in the hot and humid climate of the south, an epidemic broke out quickly amongst the soldiers, and the weakened army was unable to cross the mountains, forcing them to withdraw which ended in Nanyue victory, but the military conflict did not stop until the Empress died. Zhao Tuo then annexed the neighboring state of Minyue in the east as subject kingdom. The kingdom of Yelang and Tongshi (通什) also submitted to Nanyue rule.

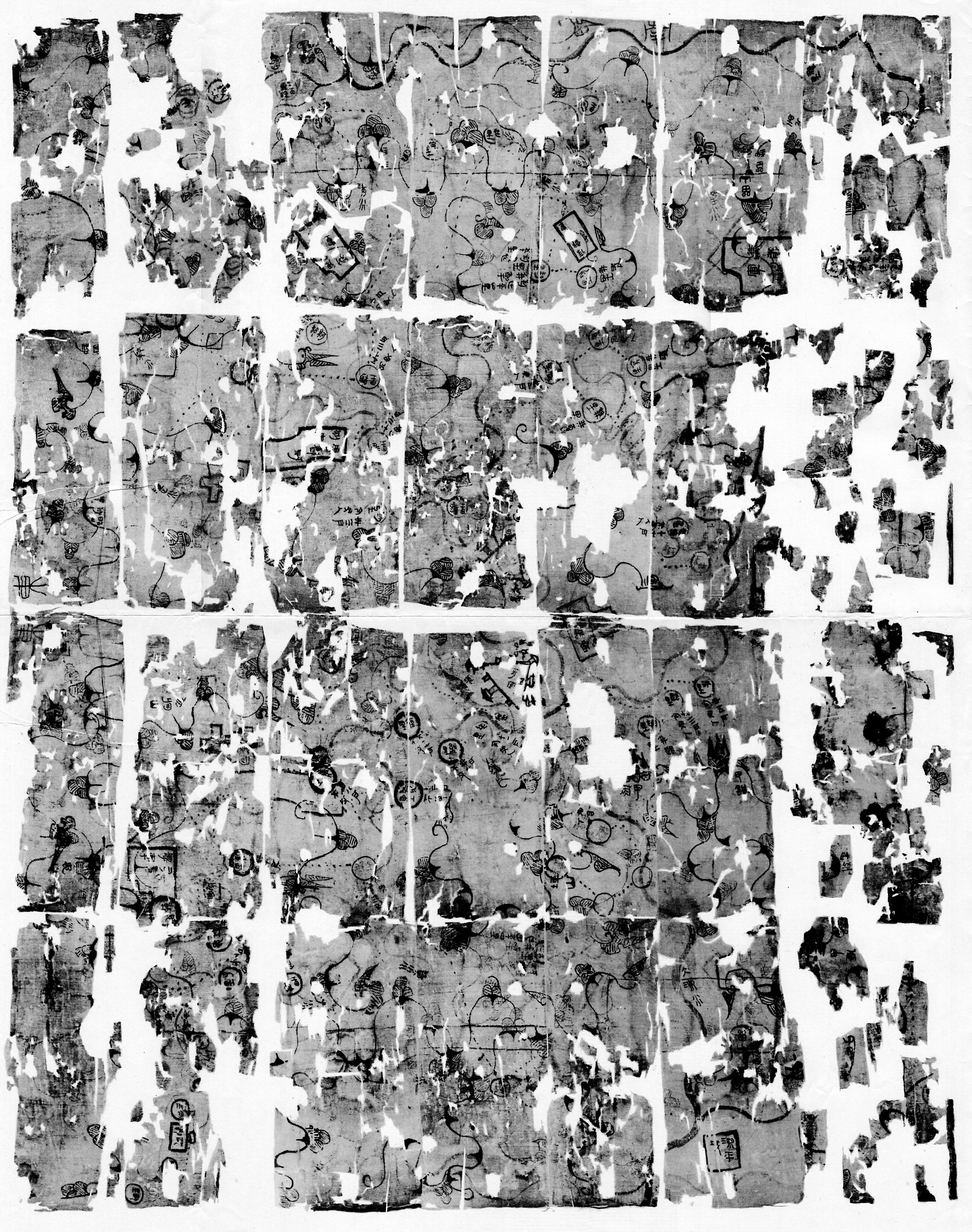
The map found in Tomb 3 of Mawangdui Han tombs site, marking the positions of Han military garrisons that were employed in an attack against Nanyue in 181 BC.

In 179 BC, Liu Heng ascended the throne as Emperor of the Han. He reversed many of the previous policies of Empress Lü and took a conciliatory attitude toward Zhao Tuo and Nanyue. He ordered officials to revisit Zhending, garrison the town, and make offerings to Zhao Tuo's ancestors regularly. His prime minister Chen Ping suggested sending Lu Jia to Nanyue as they were familiar with each other. Lu arrived once more in Panyu and delivered a letter from the Emperor emphasizing that Empress Lü's policies were what had caused the hostility between Nanyue and the Han court and brought suffering to the border citizens. Zhao Tuo decided to submit to the Han once again, withdrawing his title of "emperor" and reverting to "king", and Nanyue became Han's subject state. However, most of the changes were superficial, and Zhao Tuo continued to be referred to as "emperor" throughout Nanyue.

=== Zhao Mo ===
In 137 BC, Zhao Tuo died, having lived over one hundred years. Because of his great age, his son, the Crown Prince Zhao Shi, had preceded him in death, and therefore Zhao Tuo's grandson Zhao Mo became king of Nanyue. In 135 BC, the king of neighboring Minyue launched an attack on the towns along the two kingdoms' borders. Because Zhao Mo hadn't yet consolidated his rule, he was forced to implore Emperor Wu of Han to send troops to Nanyue's aid against what he called "the rebels of Minyue". The Emperor lauded Zhao Mo for his vassal loyalty and sent Wang Hui, an official governing ethnic minorities, and agricultural official Han Anguo at the head of an army with orders to separate and attack Minyue from two directions, one from Yuzhang Commandery, and the other from Kuaiji Commandery. Before they reached Minyue, however, the Minyue king was assassinated by his younger brother Yu Shan, who promptly surrendered.

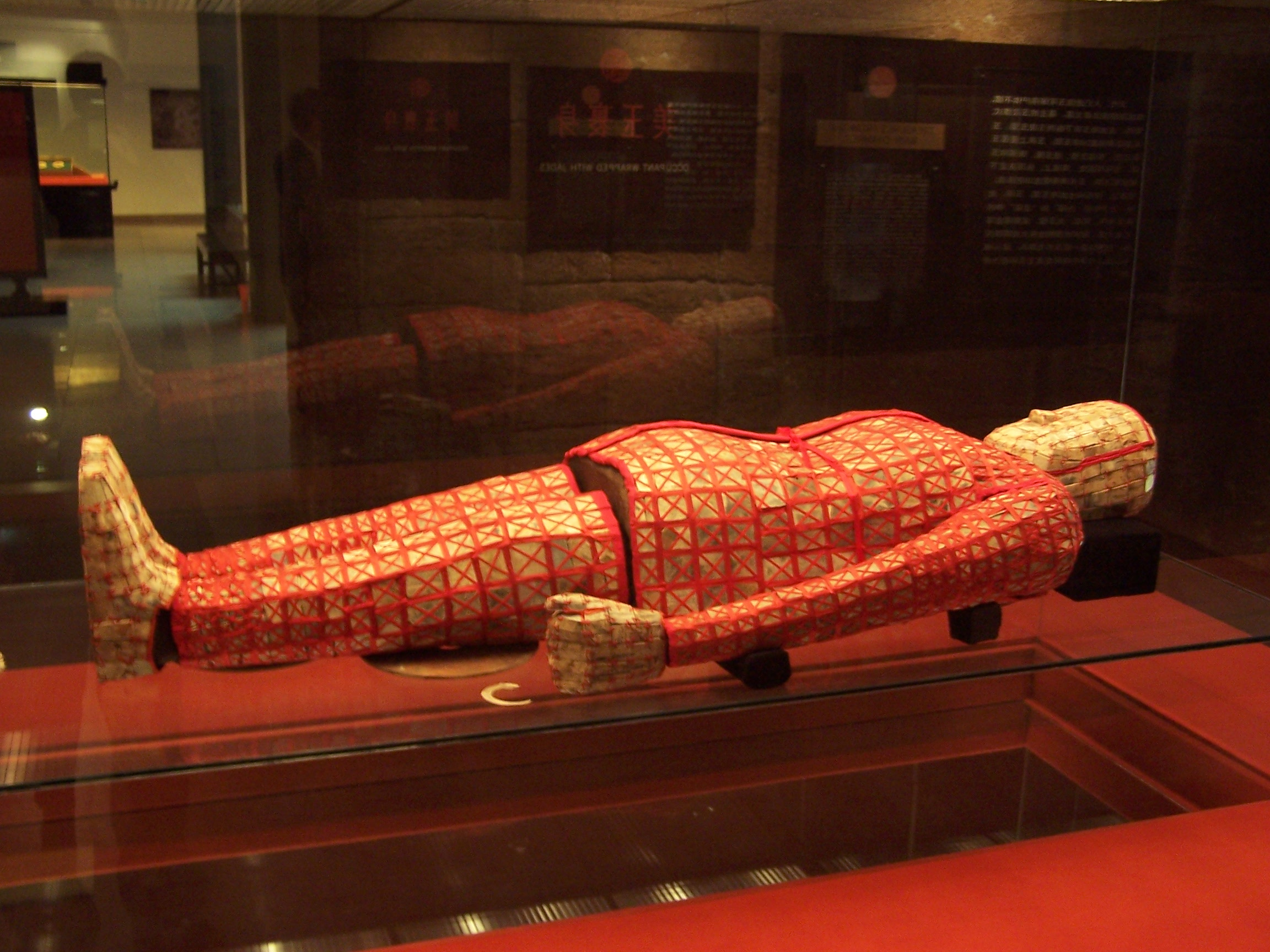
Zhao Mo's Jade Burial Suit Sewn with Silk Thread, Nanyue King Museum

The Emperor sent court emissary Yan Zhu to the Nanyue capital to give an official report of Minyue's surrender to Zhao Mo, who had Yan return his gratitude to the Emperor along with a promise that Zhao would come visit the Imperial Court in Chang'an, and even sent his son Zhao Yingqi to return with Yan to the Chinese capital. Before the king could ever leave for Chang'an himself, one of his ministers strenuously advised against going for fear that Emperor Wu would find some pretext to prevent him from returning, thus leading to the destruction of Nanyue. King Zhao Mo thereupon feigned illness and never travelled to the Han capital.

Immediately following Minyue's surrender to the Han army, Wang Hui had dispatched a man named Tang Meng, local governor of Panyang County, to deliver the news to Zhao Mo. While in Nanyue, Tang Meng was introduced to the Yue custom of eating a sauce made from medlar fruit imported from Shu Commandery. Surprised that such a product was available, he learned that there was a route from Shu (modern Sichuan) to Yelang, and then along the Zangke River (now known as the Beipan River of Yunnan and Guizhou) which allowed direct access to the Nanyue capital Panyu. Tang Meng thereupon drafted a memorial to Emperor Wu suggesting a gathering of 100,000 elite soldiers at Yelang who would navigate the Zangke River and launch a surprise attack on Nanyue. Emperor Wu agreed with Tang's plan and promoted him to General of Langzhong and had him lead a thousand soldiers with a multitude of provisions and supply carts from Bafu Pass (near modern Hejiang County) into Yelang. Many of the carts carried ceremonial gifts which Yelang presented to the feudal lords of Yelang as bribes to declare allegiance to the Han dynasty, which they did, and Yelang became Qianwei Commandery of the Han Empire.

Zhao Mo fell ill and died around 122 BC.

=== Zhao Yingqi ===
After hearing of his father's serious illness, Zhao Yingqi received permission from Emperor Wu to return to Nanyue. After Zhao Mo's death, Yingqi assumed the Nanyue throne. Before leaving for Chang'an he had married a young Yue woman and had his eldest son Zhao Jiande. While in Chang'an, he also married a Han Chinese woman, like himself, who was from Handan. Together they had a son Zhao Xing. After assuming the Nanyue kingship, he petitioned the emperor to appoint his Chinese wife (who was from the Jiu 樛 family) as Queen and Zhao Xing as Crown Prince, a move that eventually brought disaster upon Nanyue. Zhao Yingqi was reputed to be a tyrant who killed citizens with flippant abandon. He died of illness around 113 BC.

=== Zhao Xing and Zhao Jiande ===
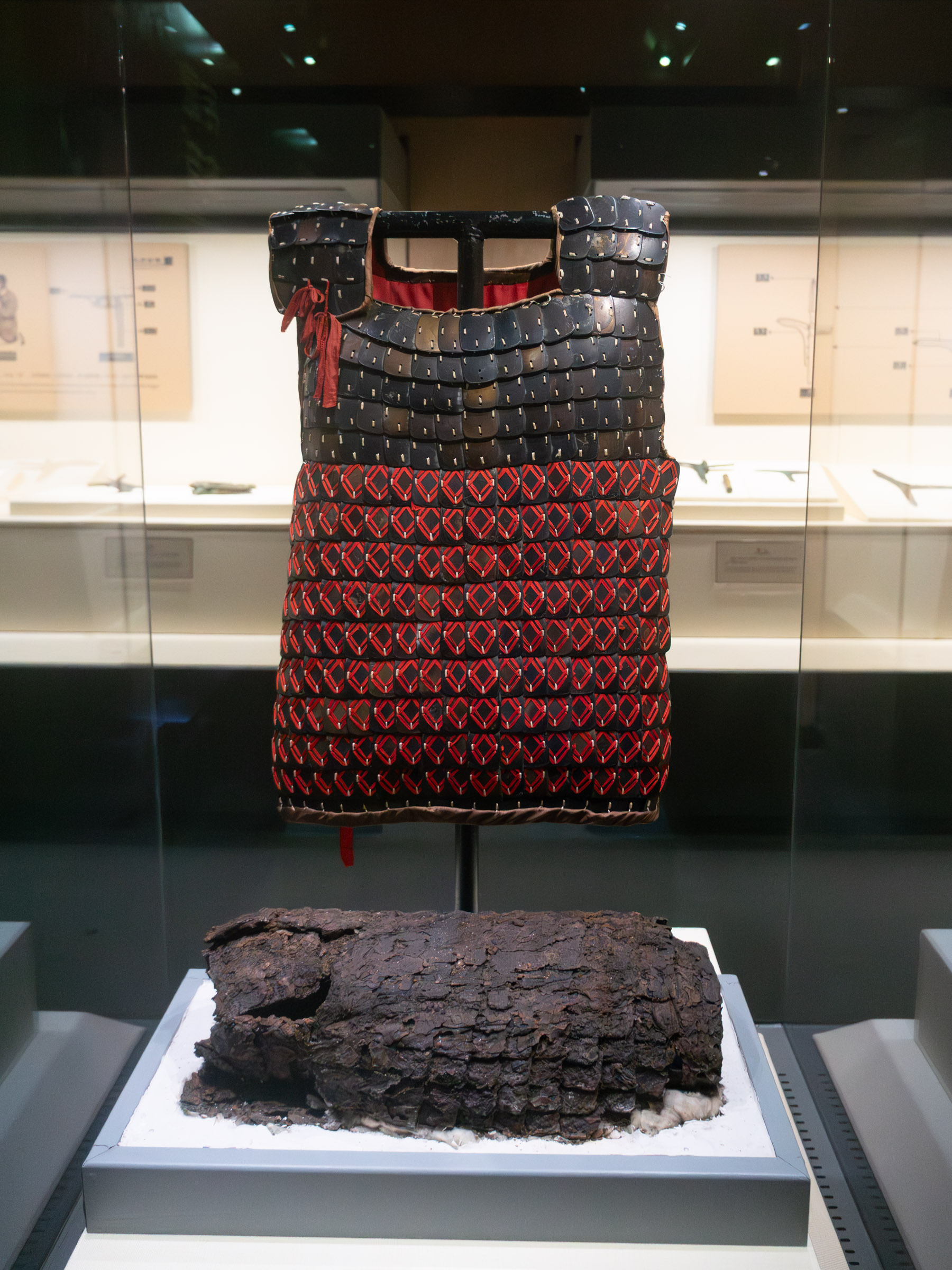
Lamellar armour and reproduction, Nanyue King Museum

Zhao Xing succeeded his father as king, and his mother became Queen Dowager. In 113 BC, Emperor Wu of Han sent senior minister Anguo Shaoji to Nanyue summon Zhao Xing and his mother to Chang'an for an audience with the Emperor, as well as two other officials with soldiers to await a response at Guiyang. At the time, Zhao Xing was still young and the Queen Dowager was a recent immigrant to Nanyue, so final authority in matters of state rested in the hands of Prime Minister Lü Jia. Before the Queen Dowager married Zhao Yingqi, it was widely rumored that she had had an affair with Anguo Shaoji, and they were said to have renewed it when he was sent to Nanyue, which caused the Nanyue citizens to lose confidence in her rule.

Fearful of losing her position of authority, Queen Dowager Jiu persuaded Zhao Xing and his ministers to fully submit to Han dynasty rule, shifting Nanyue from an outer vassal state (外属诸侯国) to an inner vassal state (内属诸侯国) to Han dynasty. At the same time, she dispatched a memorial to Emperor Wu requesting that they would join Han China, that they might have an audience with the Emperor every third year, and that the borders between Han China and Nanyue might be dissolved. The Emperor Wu granted her requests and sent Imperial seals to the Prime Minister and other senior officials, symbolizing that the Han court expected to directly control the appointments of senior officials. He also abolished the penal tattooing and nose-removal criminal punishments that were practiced among the Yue and instituted Han legal statutes. Emissaries that had been sent to Nanyue were instructed to remain there to ensure the stability of Han control. Upon receiving their Imperial decrees, King Zhao and the Queen Dowager began planning to leave for Chang'an.

Prime Minister Lü Jia was much older than most officials and had served since the reign of Zhao Xing's grandfather Zhao Mo. His family was the preeminent Yue family in Nanyue and was thoroughly intermarried with the Zhao royal family. He vehemently opposed Nanyue's submission to the Han dynasty and criticized Zhao Xing on numerous occasions, though his outcries were ignored. Lü decided to begin planning a coup and feigned illness to avoid meeting the emissaries of the Han court. The emissaries were well aware of Lü's influence in the kingdom – it easily rivalled that of the king – but were never able to remove him. Sima Qian recorded a story that the Queen Dowager and the Zhao Xing invited Lü to a banquet with several Han emissaries where they hoped to find a chance to kill Lü: during the banquet, the Queen Dowager mentioned that Prime Minister Lü was against Nanyue submitting to the Han dynasty, with the hope that the Han emissaries would become enraged and kill Lü. However, Lü's younger brother had surrounded the palace with armed guards, and the Han emissaries, led by Anguo Shaoji, didn't dare attack Lü. Sensing the danger of the moment, Lü excused himself and stood to leave the palace. The Queen Dowager herself became furious and tried to grab a spear with which to kill the Prime Minister personally, but she was stopped by her son, the king. Lü Jia instructed his brother's armed men to surround his compound and stand guard and feigned illness, refusing to meet with King Zhao or any Han emissaries. At the same time, he began seriously plotting the upcoming coup with other officials.

When news of the situation reached Emperor Wu, he dispatched a man named Han Qianqiu with 2,000 officials to Nanyue to wrest control from Lü Jia. In 112 BC, the men crossed into Nanyue territory, and Lü Jia finally executed his plan. He and those loyal to him appealed to the citizens that Zhao Xing was but a youth, Queen Dowager Jiu a foreigner who was plotting with the Han emissaries with the intent to turn the country over to Han China, giving over all of Nanyue's treasures to the Han Emperor and selling Yue citizens to the Imperial court as slaves with no thought for the welfare of the Yue people themselves. With the people's support, Lü Jia and his younger brother led a large group of men into the king's palace, killing Zhao Xing, Queen Dowager Jiu, and all the Han emissaries in the capital.

After the assassinations of Zhao Xing, the Queen Dowager, and the Han emissaries, Lü Jia ensured that Zhao Jiande, Zhao Yingqi's eldest son by his native Yue wife, took the throne, and quickly sent messengers to spread the news to the feudal rulers and officials of various areas of Nanyue.

=== War and the decline of Nanyue ===
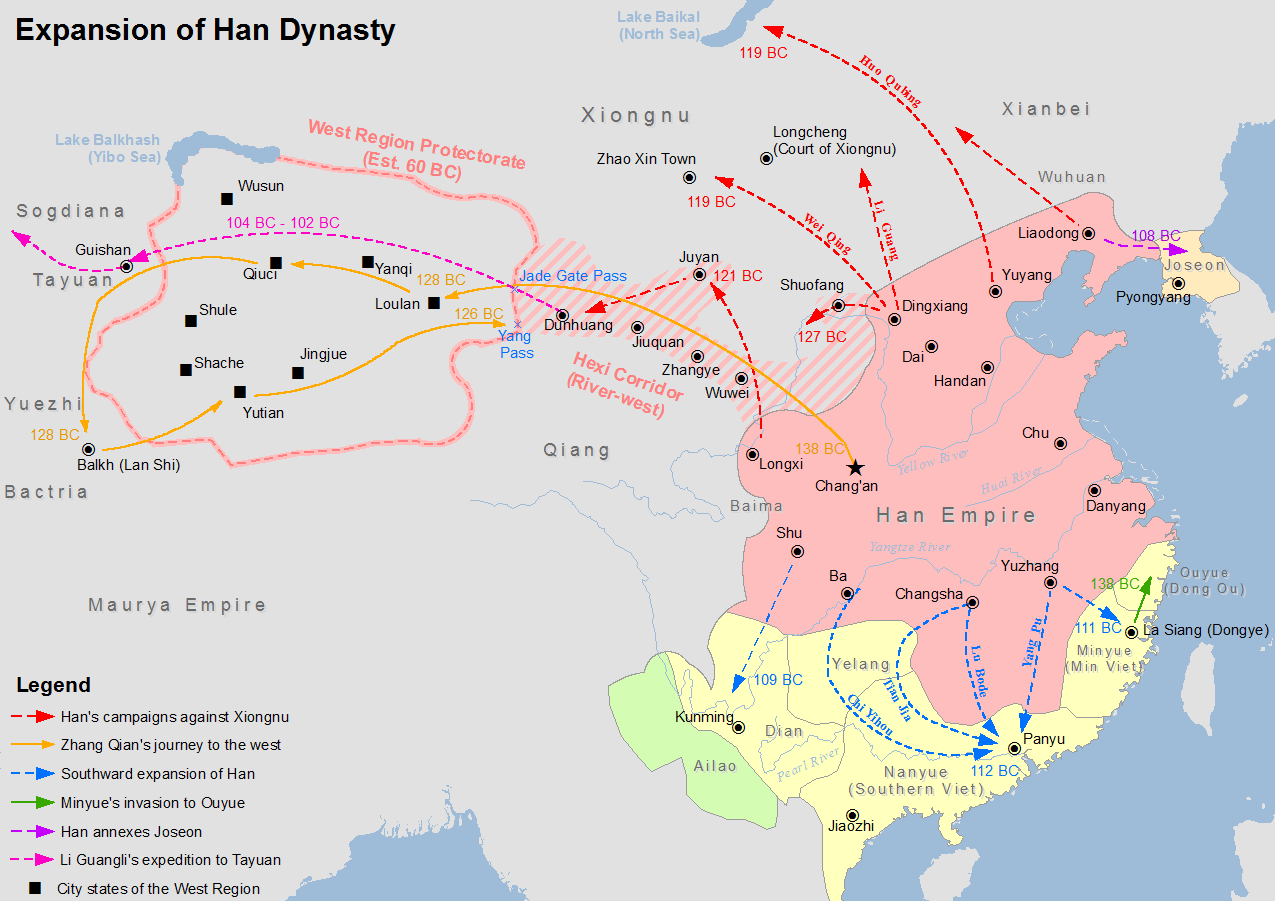
Map showing the expansion of Han dynasty in the 2nd century BC

The 2,000 men led by Han Qianqiu began attacking towns along the Han-Nanyue border, and the Yue residents ceased resisting them, instead giving them supplies and safe passage. The group of men advanced quickly through Nanyue territory and were only 40 li from Panyu when they were ambushed by a regiment of Nanyue soldiers and completely annihilated. Lü Jia then took the imperial tokens of the Han emissaries and placed them in a ceremonial wooden box, then attached to it a fake letter of apology and installed it on the border of Han and Nanyue, along with military reinforcements. When Emperor Wu heard of the coup and Prime Minister Lü's actions, he became enraged. After issuing compensation to the families of the slain emissaries, he decreed the immediate mobilization of an army to attack Nanyue.

In autumn of 111 BC, Emperor Wu sent an army of 100,000 men divided into five companies to attack Nanyue. The first company was led by General Lu Bode and advanced from Guiyang (modern Lianzhou) down the Huang River (now called the Lian River). The second company was led by Commander Yang Pu and advanced from Yuzhang Commandery (modern Nanchang) through the Hengpu Pass and down the Zhen River. The third and fourth companies were led by Zheng Yan and Tian Jia, both Yue chieftains who had joined the Han dynasty. The third company left from Lingling (modern Yongzhou) and sailed down the Li River, while the fourth company went directly to garrison Cangwu (modern Wuzhou). The fifth company was led by He Yi and was composed mainly of prisoners from Shu and Ba with soldiers from Yelang; they sailed directly down the Zangke River (modern Beipan River). At the same time, Yu Shan, a king of Dong'ou, declared his intention to participate in the Han dynasty's attack on Nanyue and sent 8,000 men to support Yang Pu's company. However, upon reaching Jieyang, they pretended to have encountered severe winds that prevented them from advancing, and secretly sent details of the invasion to Nanyue.

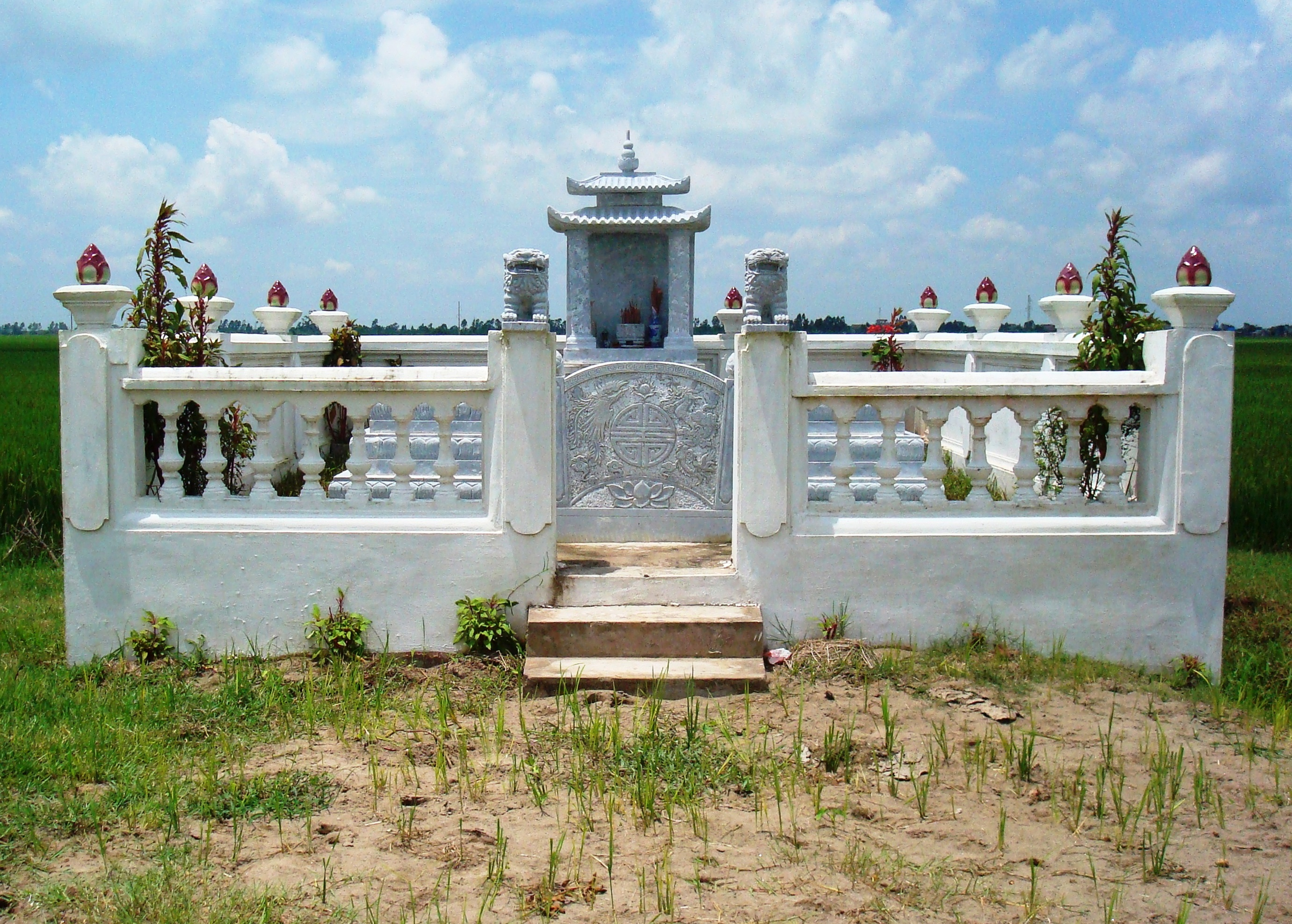
Tomb of Prime Minister Lü Jia and General Nguyễn Danh Lang in Ân Thi District, Hưng Yên Province, Vietnam.

By winter of that year, Yang Pu's company had attacked Xunxia and moved on to destroy the northern gates of Panyu (modern Guangzhou), capturing Nanyue's naval fleet and provisions. Seizing the opportunity, they continued south and defeated the first wave of Nanyue defenders before stopping to await the company led by Lu Bode. Lu's forces were mostly convicts freed in exchange for military service and made slow time, so at the planned rendezvous date with Yang Pu only a thousand of Lu's men had arrived. They went ahead with the attack anyway, and Yang's men led the advance into Panyu where Lü Jia and Zhao Jiande had fortified inside the inner walls. Yang Pu set up a camp southeast of the city and, as darkness fell, set the city on fire. Lu Bode encamped the northwest side of the city and sent soldiers up to the walls to encourage the Nanyue soldiers to surrender. As the night passed, more and more Panyu defenders defected to Lu Bode's camp out of desperation, so that as dawn arrived most of the Nanyue soldiers were gone. Lü Jia and Zhao Jiande realized Panyu was lost and fled the city by boat, heading west before the sun rose. Upon interrogating the surrendered soldiers, the Han generals learned of the two Nanyue leaders' escape and sent men after them. Zhao Jiande was caught first, and Lü Jia was captured in what is now northern Vietnam. Based on many temples of Lü Jia (Lữ Gia), his wives and soldiers scattering in Red River Delta of northern Vietnam, the war might last until 98 BC.

After the fall of Panyu, Tây Vu Vương (the captain of Tây Vu area of which the center is Cổ Loa) revolted against the First Chinese domination from Western Han dynasty. He was killed by his assistant Hoàng Đồng (黄同).

Afterwards, the other commanderies and counties of Nanyue surrendered to the Han dynasty, ending Nanyue's 93-year existence as an autonomous and mostly sovereign kingdom. When news of Nanyue's defeat reached Emperor Wu, he was staying in Zuoyi County in Shanxi while travelling to perform imperial inspections, and promptly created the new county of Wenxi, meaning "Hearing of Glad News". After Lü Jia's capture he was executed by the Han soldiers and his head was sent to the emperor. Upon receiving it, he created Huojia County where he was travelling, meaning "Capturing [Lü] Jia".

== Geography and demographics ==
=== Borders ===
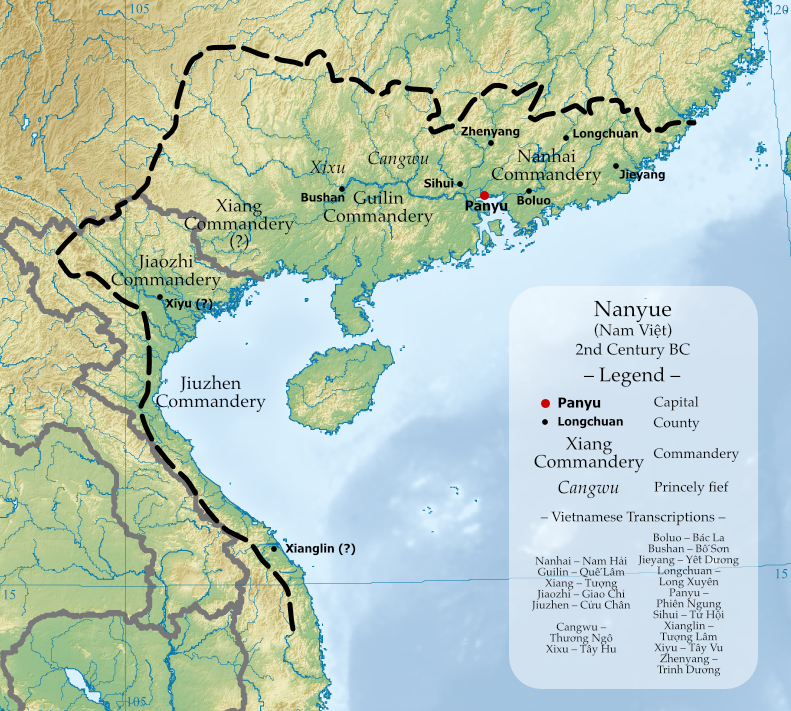
Commanderies and known counties of Nanyue

Nanyue originally comprised the Qin commanderies of Nanhai, Guilin, and Xiang. After 179 BC, Zhao Tuo persuaded Minyue, Yelang, Tongshi, and other areas to submit to Nanyue rule, but they were not strictly under Nanyue control. After the Western Han dynasty defeated Nanyue, its territory was divided into the seven commanderies of Nanhai, Cangwu, Yulin, Hepu, Jiaozhi, Jiuzhen, and Rinan. It was traditionally believed that the Qin conquest of the southern regions included the northern half of Vietnam, and that this area was also under Nanyue control. However, scholars have recently stated that the Qin likely never conquered territory in what is now Vietnam, and that Chinese domination there was first accomplished by the Nanyue themselves.

=== Administrative Divisions ===
Zhao Tuo followed the Commandery-County system of the Qin dynasty when organizing the Kingdom of Nanyue. He left Nanhai Commandery and Guilin Commandery intact, then divided Xiang Commandery into the Jiaozhi and Jiuzhen Commanderies. Nanhai comprised most of modern Guangdong, and was divided by the Qin into Panyu, Longchuan, Boluo, and Jieyang Counties, to which Zhao Tuo added Zhenyang and Hankuang.

=== Ethnicities ===
The majority of Nanyue's residents consisted of mainly Yue peoples. The Han Chinese population consisted of descendants of Qin armies sent to conquer the south, as well as girls who worked as army prostitutes, exiled Qin officials, exiled criminals, merchants and so on.

The Yue people were divided into numerous branches, tribes, and clans.

The Nanyue lived in north, east, and central Guangdong, as well as a small group in east Guangxi.

The Xi'ou lived in most of Guangxi and western Guangdong, with most of the population concentrated along the Xun River region and areas south of the Gui River, both part of the Xi River watershed. Descendants of Yi-Xu-Song, the chieftain killed resisting the Qin armies, acted as self-imposed governors of the Xi'ou clans. At the time of Nanyue's defeat by the Han dynasty, there were several hundred thousand Xi'ou people in Guilin Commandery alone.

The Luoyue clans lived in what is now western and southern Guangxi, northern Vietnam, the Leizhou Peninsula, Hainan, and southwest Guizhou. Populations were centered in the Zuo and You watersheds in Guangxi, the Red River Delta in northern Vietnam, and the Pan River watershed in Guizhou. The Chinese name "Luo", which denoted a white horse with a black mane, is said to have been applied to them after the Chinese saw their slash-and-burn method of hillside cultivation.

== Government ==
=== Administrative system ===
Because the Kingdom of Nanyue was established by Zhao Tuo, a Chinese general of the Qin dynasty, Nanyue's political and bureaucratic systems were, at first, essentially just continuations of those of the Qin Empire itself. Because of Zhao Tuo's submissions to the Han dynasty, Nanyue also adopted many of the changes enacted by the Han, as well. At the same time, Nanyue enjoyed complete autonomy – and de facto sovereignty – for most of its existence, so its rulers did enact several systems that were entirely unique to Nanyue.

Nanyue was a monarchy, and its head of state generally held the title of "king" (Chinese: 王), though its first two rulers Zhao Tuo and Zhao Mo were referred to as "Emperor" within Nanyue's borders. The kingdom had its own Calendar era system based (like China's) on Emperors' reign periods. Succession in the monarchy was based on hereditary rule, with the King or Emperor's successor designated as crown prince. The ruler's mother was designated empress dowager, his wife as empress or queen, and his concubines as "Madam" (Chinese: 夫人). The formalities extended to the ruler's family were on the level of that of the Han dynasty Emperor, rather than that of a feudal king.

Although Nanyue continued the Commandery-County system of the Qin dynasty, its leaders later enfeoffed their own feudal princes and lords – a mark of its sovereignty – in a manner similar to that of the Western Han. Imperial documents from Nanyue record that princes were enfeoffed at Cangwu, Xixu, as well as local lords at Gaochang and elsewhere. Zhao Guang, a relative of Zhao Tuo, was made King of Cangwu, and his holdings were what is now Wuzhou in the Guangxi Zhuang Autonomous Region. In what is considered a manifestation of Zhao Tuo's respect for the Hundred Yue, he enfeoffed a Yue chieftain as King of Xixu in order to allow the Yue of that area to enjoy autonomy under a ruler of their own ethnicity. The chieftain's name is unknown, but he was a descendant of Yi-Xu-Song, the chieftain killed while fighting the original Chinese invasion under the Qin dynasty.

Nanyue's bureaucracy was, like the famed bureaucracy of the Qin dynasty, divided into central and regional governments. The central government comprised a prime minister who held military and administrative authority, inner scribes who served under the prime minister, overseeing Censors of various rank and position, commanders of the Imperial Guard, senior officials who carried out the King's official administration, as well as all military officers and officials of the Food, Music, Transportation, Agriculture, and other bureaus.

Nanyue enacted several other policies that reflected Chinese dominance, such as the household registration system (an early form of census), as well as the promulgation of the use of Chinese characters among the Hundred Yue population and the use of Chinese weights and measures.

=== Military ===
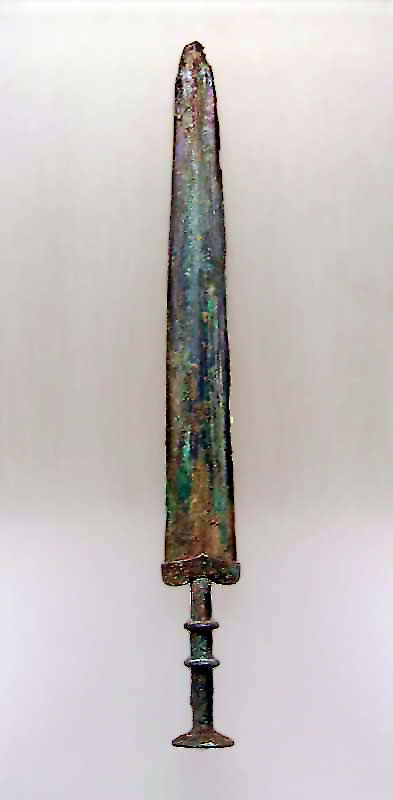
Bronze sword excavated from a tomb in Guangxi that dates to the late Warring States period or early Nanyue Kingdom.

Nanyue's army was largely composed of the several hundred thousand (up to 500,000) Qin Chinese troops that invaded during the Qin dynasty and their descendants. After the kingdom's founding in 204 BC, some Yue citizens also joined the army. Nanyue's military officers were known as General, General of the Left, Xiao ("Colonel"), Wei ("Captain"), etc., essentially identical to the Chinese system. The army had infantry, naval troops, and cavalry.

=== Ethnic policy ===
The Kingdom continued most of the Qin Commanderies' policies and practices dealing with the interactions between the local Yue and the Han immigrants, and Zhao Tuo proactively promoted a policy of assimilating the two cultures into each other. Although the Han were certainly dominant in holding leadership positions, the overwhelming disparity was largest immediately after the Qin conquest. Over time, the Yue gradually began holding more positions of authority in the government. Lü Jia, the last prime minister of the Kingdom, was a Yue citizen, and over 70 of his kinsmen served as officials in various parts of the government. In areas of particular "complexity", as they were called, Yue chieftains were often enfeoffed with great autonomy, such as in Xixu. Under the impetus of Zhao Tuo's leadership, Chinese immigrants were encouraged to adopt the customs of the Yue. Marriages between the Han Chinese and Yue became increasingly common throughout Nanyue's existence, and even occurred in the Zhao royal family. Many marriages between the Zhao royal family (who were Han Chinese) and the Lü family (Yue – they likely adopted Chinese names early in Nanyue's history) were recorded. Zhao Jiande, Nanyue's last king, was the son of previous king Zhao Yingqi and his Yue wife. Despite the dominating influence of the Chinese newcomers on the Hundred Yue, the amount of assimilation gradually increased over time.

== Language ==
Other than Old Chinese, which was used by Han settlers and government officials, native Nanyue people likely spoke Ancient Yue, a now extinct language. Some scholars suggest that they spoke a language related to the modern Zhuang language. Some suggest that the descendants spoke Austroasiatic languages instead. It is plausible to say that the Yue spoke more than one language. Old Chinese in the region was likely much influenced by Yue speech (and vice versa), and many loanwords in Chinese have been identified by modern scholars.

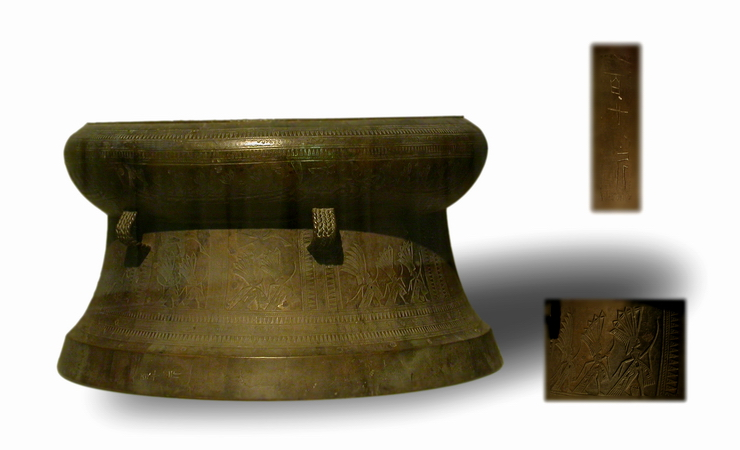
Bronze drum from Luobowan Tomb #1. Top-right closeup shows Chinese: 百廿斤; lit. '120 catties'. Bottom-right closeup shows a fishing heron and several Bird-men figures.

== Diplomacy ==
=== With the Western Han ===
Beginning with its first allegiance to the Han dynasty in 196 BC, Nanyue alternately went through two periods of allegiance to and then opposition with the Han dynasty that continued until Nanyue's destruction at the hands of the Han dynasty in early 111 BC.

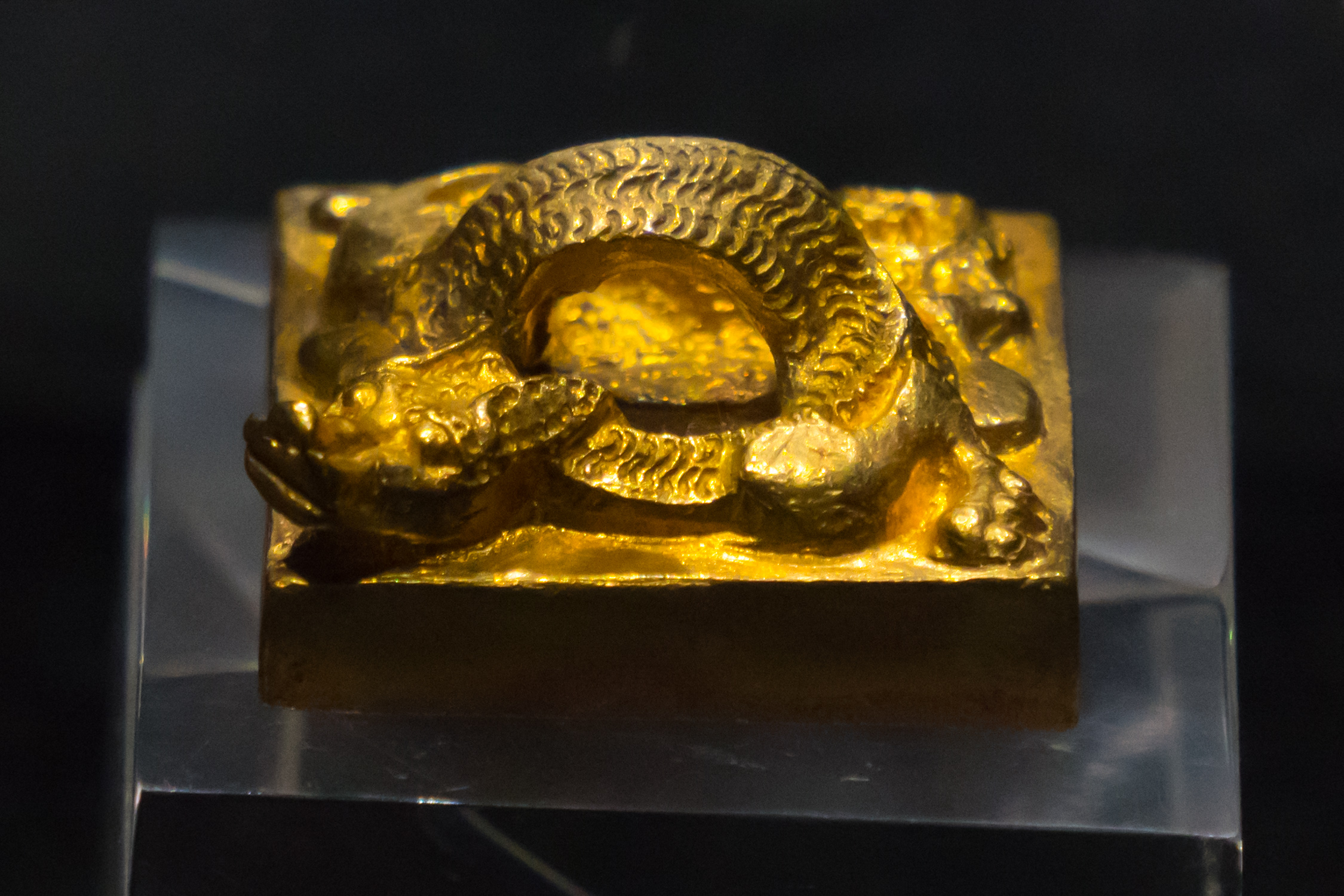
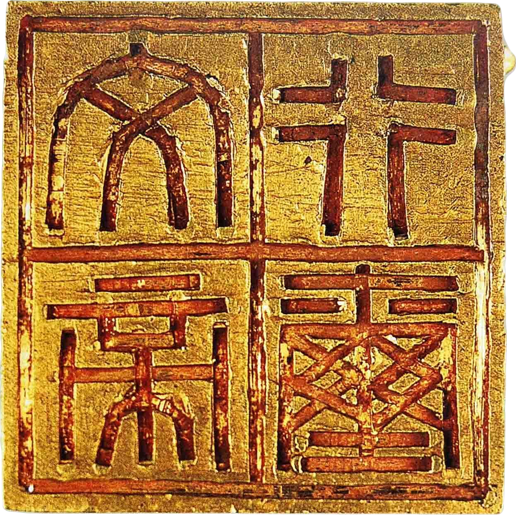
Gold seal excavated from the tomb of Zhao Mo, second King of Nanyue. The seal's characters, shown in detail on the right, read 文帝行壐 ("Imperial Seal of Emperor Wen"), which demonstrates the first Nanyue rulers' Emperor status within Nanyue itself.

The first period of Nanyue's subordination to the Han dynasty began in 196 BC when Zhao Tuo met Lü Jia, an emissary from Emperor Gaozu of Han, and received from him a Han imperial seal enthroning Zhao Tuo as King of Nanyue. This period lasted thirteen years until 183 BC, during which time significant trade took place. Nanyue paid tribute in rarities from the south, and the Han court bestowed gifts of iron tools, horses, and cattle upon Nanyue. At the same time, the countries' borders were always heavily guarded.

Nanyue's first period of antagonism with the Han dynasty lasted from 183 BC to 179 BC, when trade was suspended and Zhao Tuo severed relations with the Han. During this period, Zhao Tuo openly referred to himself as Emperor and launched an attack against the Changsha Kingdom, a feudal state of the Han dynasty, and Han troops were sent to engage Nanyue. Nanyue's armies successfully halted the southern progress of the advance, winning the respect and then allegiance of the neighboring kingdoms of Minyue and Yelang.

Nanyue's second period of submission to the Han dynasty lasted from 179 BC to 112 BC. This period began with Zhao Tuo abandoning his title of "Emperor" and declaring allegiance to the Han Empire, but the submission is mostly superficial as Zhao Tuo was referred to as emperor throughout Nanyue and the kingdom retained its autonomy. Zhao Tuo's four successors did not display the strength he had, and Nanyue dependence on Han China slowly grew, characterized by second king Zhao Mo calling upon Emperor Wu of Han to defend Nanyue from Minyue.

Nanyue's final period of antagonism with Han China was the war that proved Nanyue's destruction as a kingdom. At the time of Prime Minister Lü Jia's rebellion, Han China was enjoying a period of growth, economic prosperity, and military success, having consistently defeated the Xiongnu tribes along China's northern and northwestern borders. The weakened state of Nanyue and the strength of China at the time allowed Emperor Wu to unleash a devastating attack on Nanyue, as described above.

=== With Changsha ===
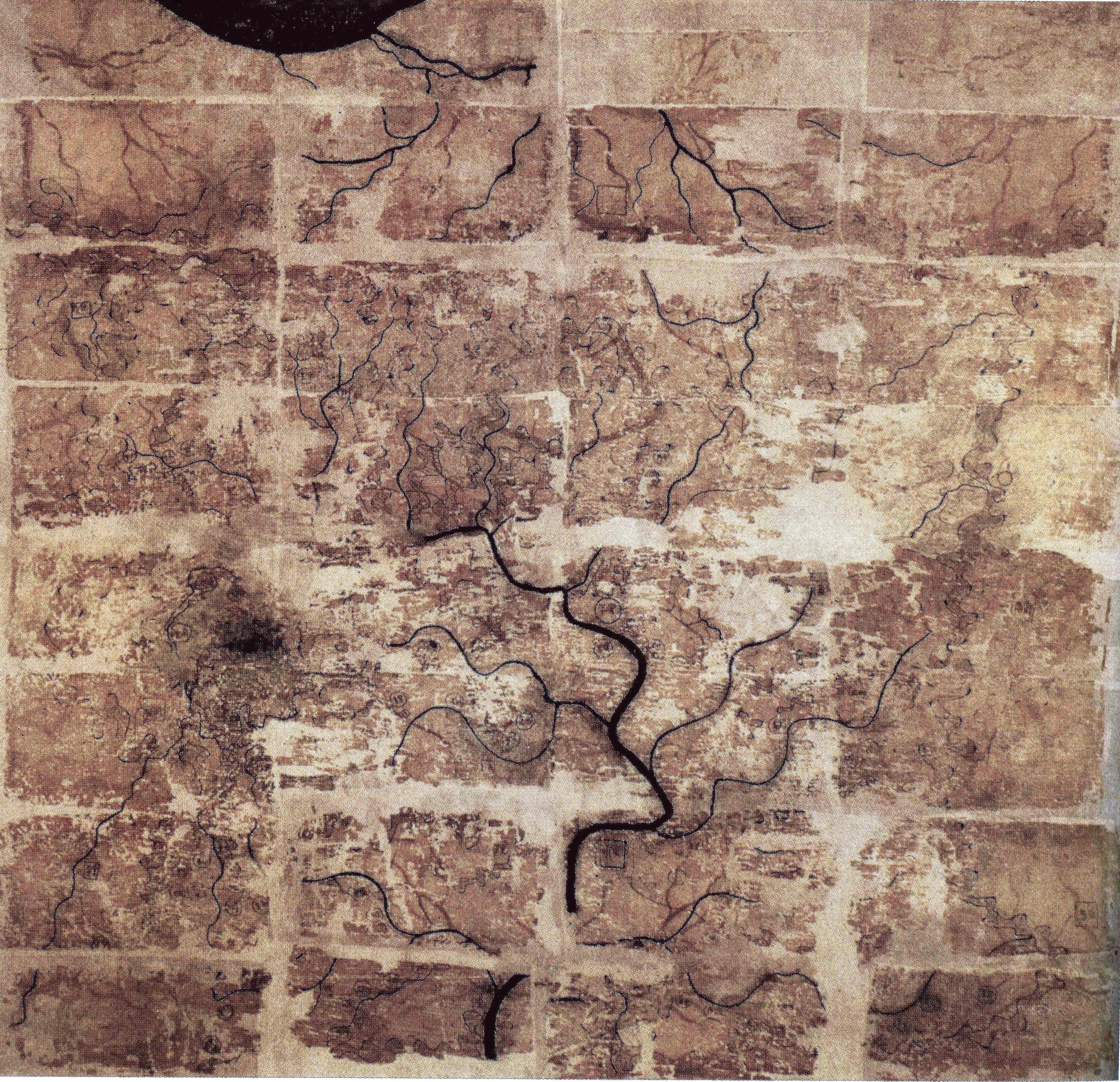
An early Western-Han silk map found in Tomb 3 of Mawangdui Han tombs site, depicting the Kingdom of Changsha and Kingdom of Nanyue (note: the south direction is oriented at the top).

The Changsha Kingdom was, at the time, a feudal kingdom that was part of Han dynasty. Its territory comprised most of modern Hunan Province and part of Jiangxi Province. When Emperor Gaozu of Han enfeoffed Wu Rui as the first King of Changsha, he also gave him the power to govern Nanhai, Xiang, and Guiling Commanderies, which caused strife between Changsha and Nanyue from the start. The Han China-Nanyue border was essentially that of Changsha, and therefore was constantly fortified on both sides. In terms of policies, because the Kingdom of Changsha had no sovereignty whatsoever, any policy of the Han court toward Nanyue was by default also Changsha's policy.

=== With Minyue ===
Minyue was located northeast of Nanyue along China's southeast coast, and comprised much of modern Fujian Province. The Minyue were defeated by the armies of the Qin dynasty in the 3rd century BC and the area was organized under Qin control as the Minzhong Commandery, and Minyue ruler Wuzhu was deposed. Because of Wuzhu's support for Liu Bang after the collapse of the Qin dynasty and the founding of the Han, he was reinstated by the Han court as King of Minyue in 202 BC.

The relations between Nanyue and Minyue can be classified into three stages: the first, from 196 BC to 183 BC, was during Zhao Tuo's first submission to the Han dynasty, and the two kingdoms were on relatively equal footing. The second stage was from 183 BC to 135 BC, when Minyue submitted to Nanyue after seeing it defeat the Han dynasty's first attack on Nanyue. The third stage began in 135 BC when King Wang Ying attacked a weakened Nanyue, forcing Zhao Mo to seek aid from Han China. Minyue once again submitted to the Han dynasty, making itself and Nanyue equals once more.

=== With the Yi tribes ===
The southwestern Yi people lived west of Nanyue, and shared borders with Nanyue in Yelang, Wulian, Juding, and other regions. Yelang was the largest state of the Yi people, comprising most of modern Guizhou and Yunnan Provinces, as well as the southern part of Sichuan Province. Some believe the ancient Yi to have been related to the Hundred Yue, with this explaining the close relationship between Yelang and Nanyue. After Nanyue first repelled the Han, nearly all of the Yi tribes declared allegiance to Nanyue, and most of them retained that allegiance until Nanyue's demise in 111 BC. During Emperor Wu of Han's final attack on Nanyue, most of the Yi tribes refused to assist in the invasion. One chieftain called Qie-Lan went so far as to openly oppose the move, later killing the emissary sent by the Han to his territory as well as the provincial governor installed in the Qianwei Commandery.

== Monarchs ==
Personal Name					Reign Period				Reigned From	Other Names
Name	Cantonese	Standard Mandarin	Zhuang	Vietnamese	Name	Cantonese	Standard Mandarin	Vietnamese	Reigned From	Other Names
趙佗	ziu^{6} to^{4}	Zhào Tuó	Ciuq Doz	Triệu Đà	武王	mou^{5} wong^{4}	Wǔ Wáng	Vũ Vương	203–137 BC	
趙眜	ziu^{6} mut^{6}	Zhào Mò	Ciuq Huz	Triệu Mạt	文王	man^{4} wong^{4}	Wén Wáng	Văn Vương	137–122 BC	趙胡
趙嬰齊	ziu^{6} jing^{1} cai^{4}	Zhào Yīngqí	Ciuq Yinghcaez	Triệu Anh Tề	明王	ming^{4} wong^{4}	Míng Wáng	Minh Vương	122–113 BC	
趙興	ziu^{6} hing^{1}	Zhào Xīng	Ciuq Hingh	Triệu Hưng	哀王	oi^{1} wong^{4}	Āi Wáng	Ai Vương	113–112 BC	
趙建德	ziu^{6} gin^{3} dak^{1}	Zhào Jiàndé	Ciuq Gendwz	Triệu Kiến Đức	陽王	joeng^{4} wong^{4}	Yáng Wáng	Dương Vương	112–111 BC	

== Archaeological findings ==
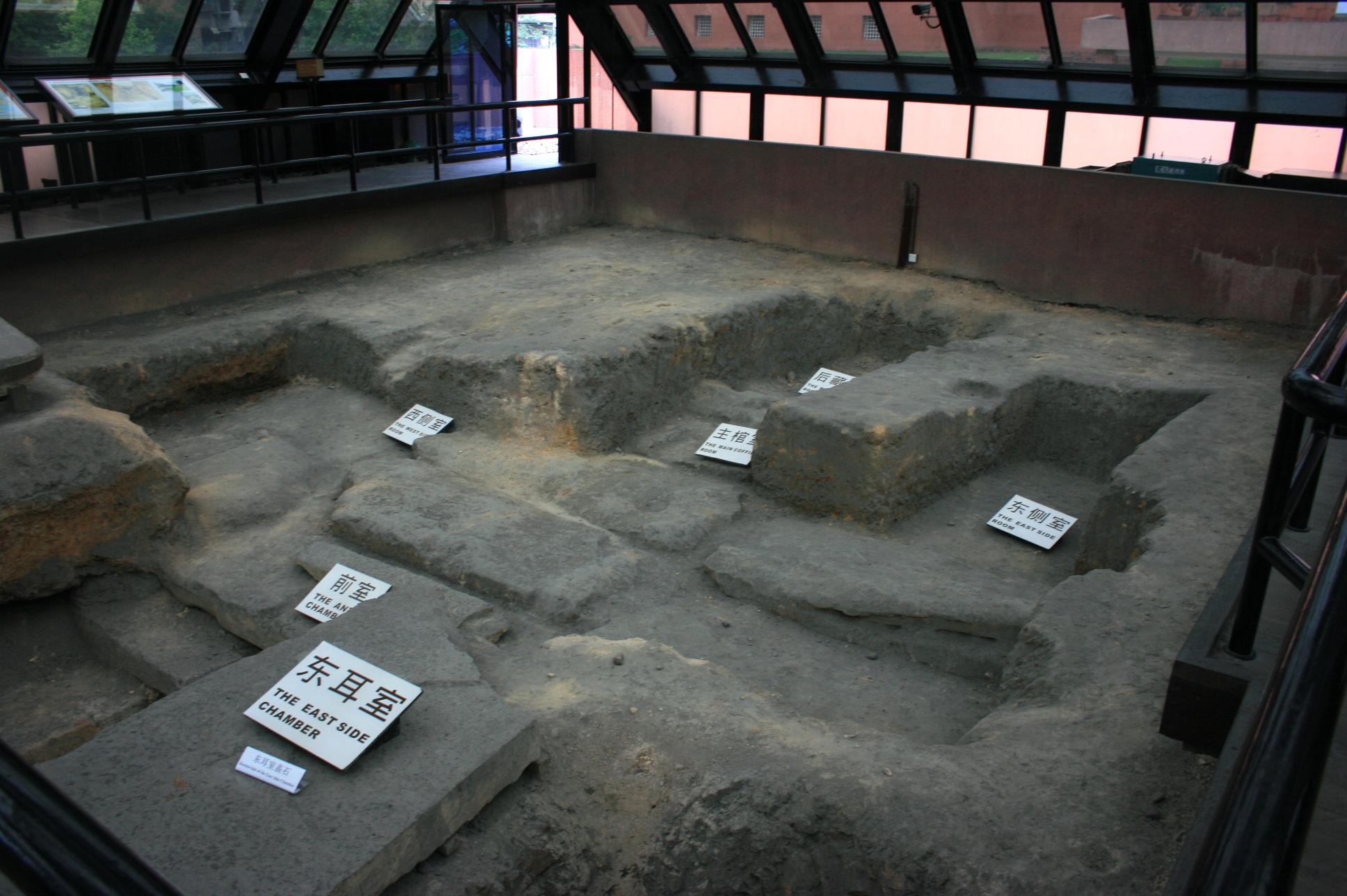
View of the tomb of Zhao Mo

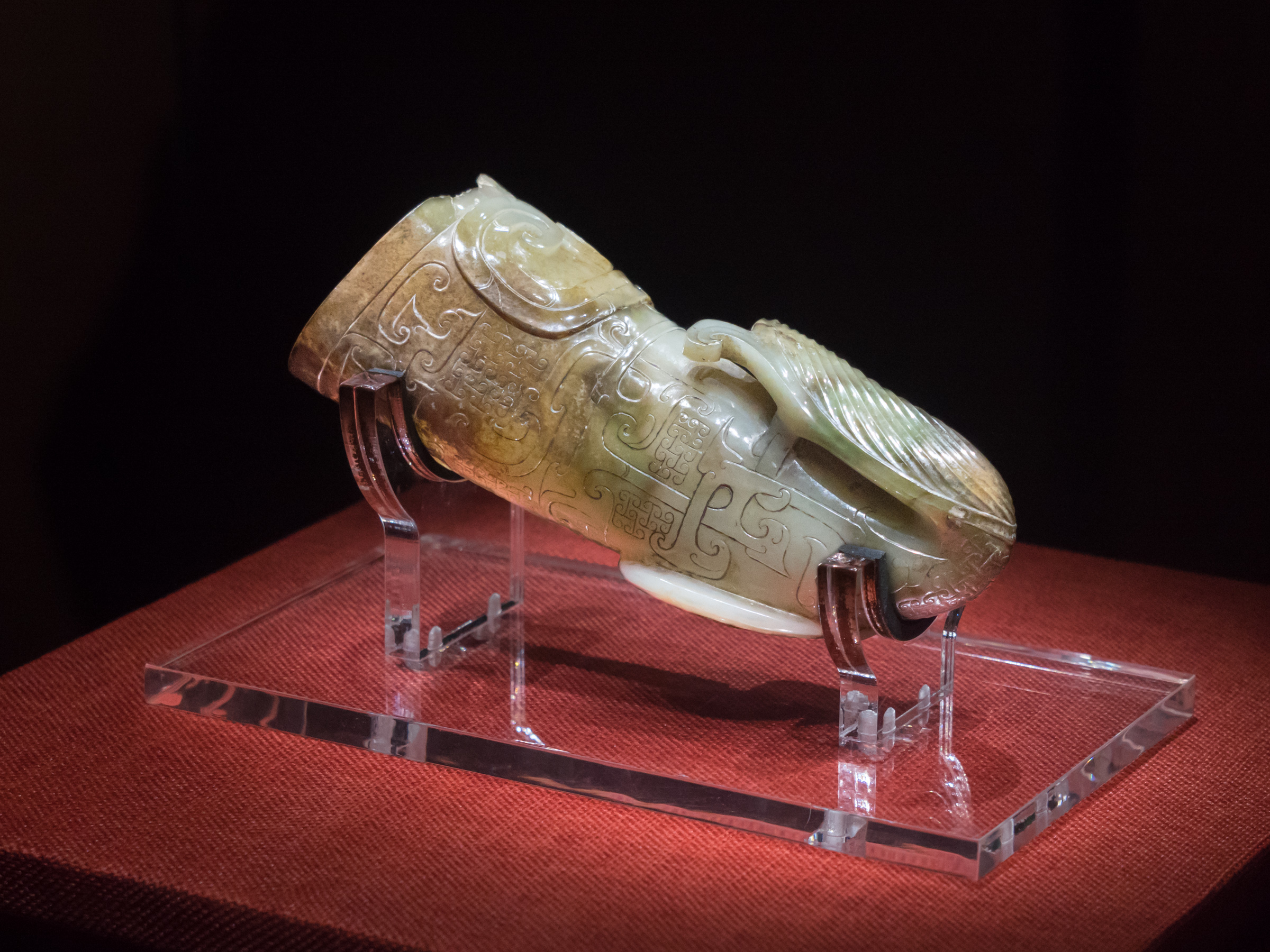
Jade drinking vessel unearthed from the tomb of Zhao Mo, Nanyue King Museum

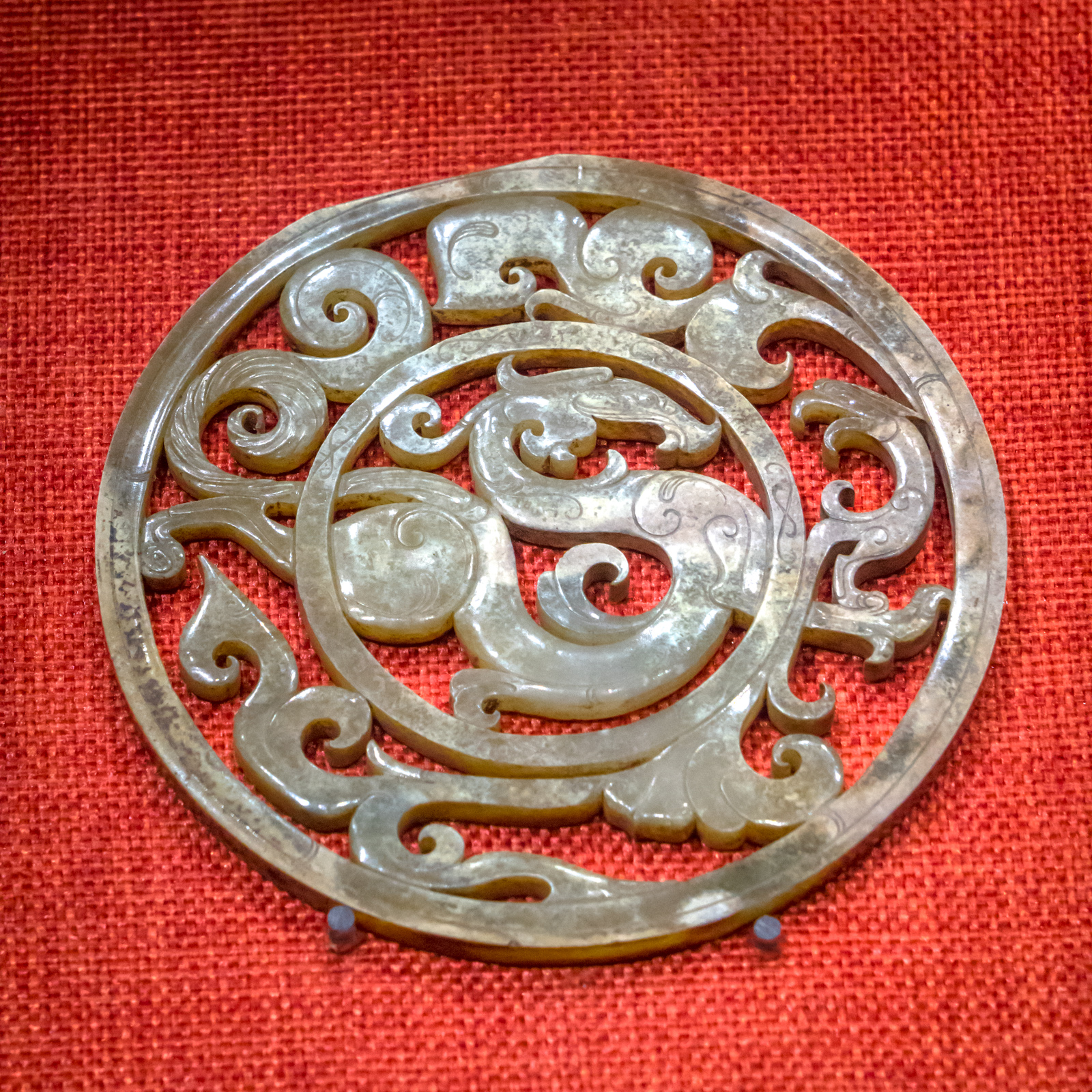
Jade openwork disk with dragon and phoenix excavated from the tomb of Zhao Mo, Nanyue King Museum

The Nanyue Kingdom Palace Ruins, located in the city of Guangzhou, covers 15,000 square metres. Excavated in 1995, it contains the remains of the ancient Nanyue palace. In 1996, it was listed as protected National Cultural Property by the Chinese government. Crescent-shaped ponds, Chinese gardens and other Qin architecture were discovered in the excavation.

In 1983, the ancient tomb of the Nanyue King Wáng Mù (王墓) was discovered in Guangzhou, Guangdong. It was later identified as the tomb of Zhào Mò, the second ruler of Nanyue. The tomb was never disturbed by tomb robbers prior to this discovery, leaving most of the artifacts intact. In 1988, the Nanyue King Museum was constructed on this site, to display more than 1,000 excavated artefacts including 500 pieces of Chinese bronzes, 240 pieces of Chinese jade and 246 pieces of metal, all of which provide invaluable information about Nanyue. In 1996, the Chinese government listed this site as a national priority protected site.

A bronze seal inscribed "Tư Phố hầu ấn" (胥浦侯印, Seal for Captain of Tu Pho County) was uncovered at Thanh Hoa in northern Vietnam during the 1930s. Owing to the similarity to seals found at the tomb of the second king of Nam Viet, this bronze seal is recognized as an official seal of the Nam Viet Kingdom. There were artifacts that were found in which belonged to the Dong Son culture of northern Vietnam. The goods were found buried alongside the tomb of the second king of Nam Viet.

== Status in Vietnamese historiography ==
In Vietnam, the rulers of Nanyue are referred to as the Triệu dynasty, the Vietnamese pronunciation of the surname Zhào (Chinese: 趙). While traditional Vietnamese historiography considered the Triệu dynasty to be an orthodox regime, modern Vietnamese scholars generally regard it as a foreign regime that ruled Vietnam. The oldest text compiled by a Vietnamese court, the 13th century Đại Việt sử ký, considered Nanyue to be the official starting point of their history. According to the Đại Việt sử ký, Zhao Tuo established the foundation of Đại Việt. However, later historians in the 18th century started questioning this view. Ngô Thì Sĩ (1726–1780) argued that Zhao Tuo was a foreign invader based in Panyu (Guangzhou) who ruled the Hong River Delta indirectly, and Nanyue was a foreign dynasty like the Southern Han that should not be included in Vietnamese history. This view became the mainstream among Vietnamese historians in North Vietnam and later became the state orthodoxy after reunification. Nanyue was removed from the national history while Zhao Tuo was recast as a foreign invader.

The name "Vietnam" is derived from Nam Việt (Southern Việt), the Vietnamese pronunciation of Nanyue. However, it has also suggested that the name "Vietnam" was derived from a combination of Quảng Nam Quốc (the domain of the Nguyen lords, from whom the Nguyễn dynasty descended) and Đại Việt (which the first emperor of the Nguyễn dynasty, Gia Long, conquered). Qing emperor Jiaqing refused Gia Long's request to change his country's name to Nam Việt, and changed the name instead to Việt Nam. Đại Nam thực lục contains the diplomatic correspondence over the naming.

== Culture ==
There was a fusion of Han and Nanyue cultures in significant ways, as shown by the artifacts unearthed by archaeologists from the tomb of King Zhao Mo in Guangzhou. The Nanyue tomb in Guangzhou is extremely rich. There are quite a number of bronzes that show cultural influences from the Han, Chu, Yue and Ordos regions.

=== Gallery ===
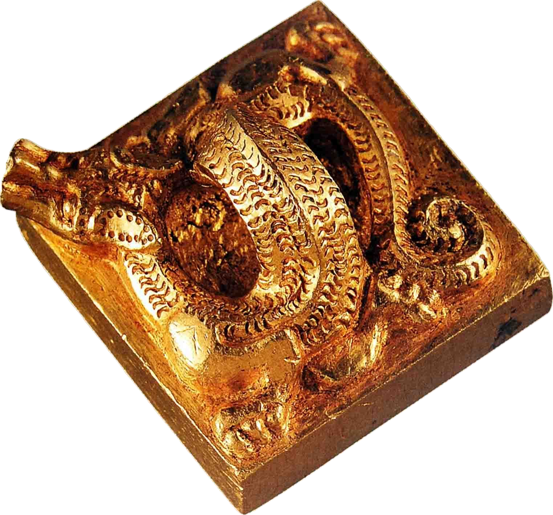
Gold seal

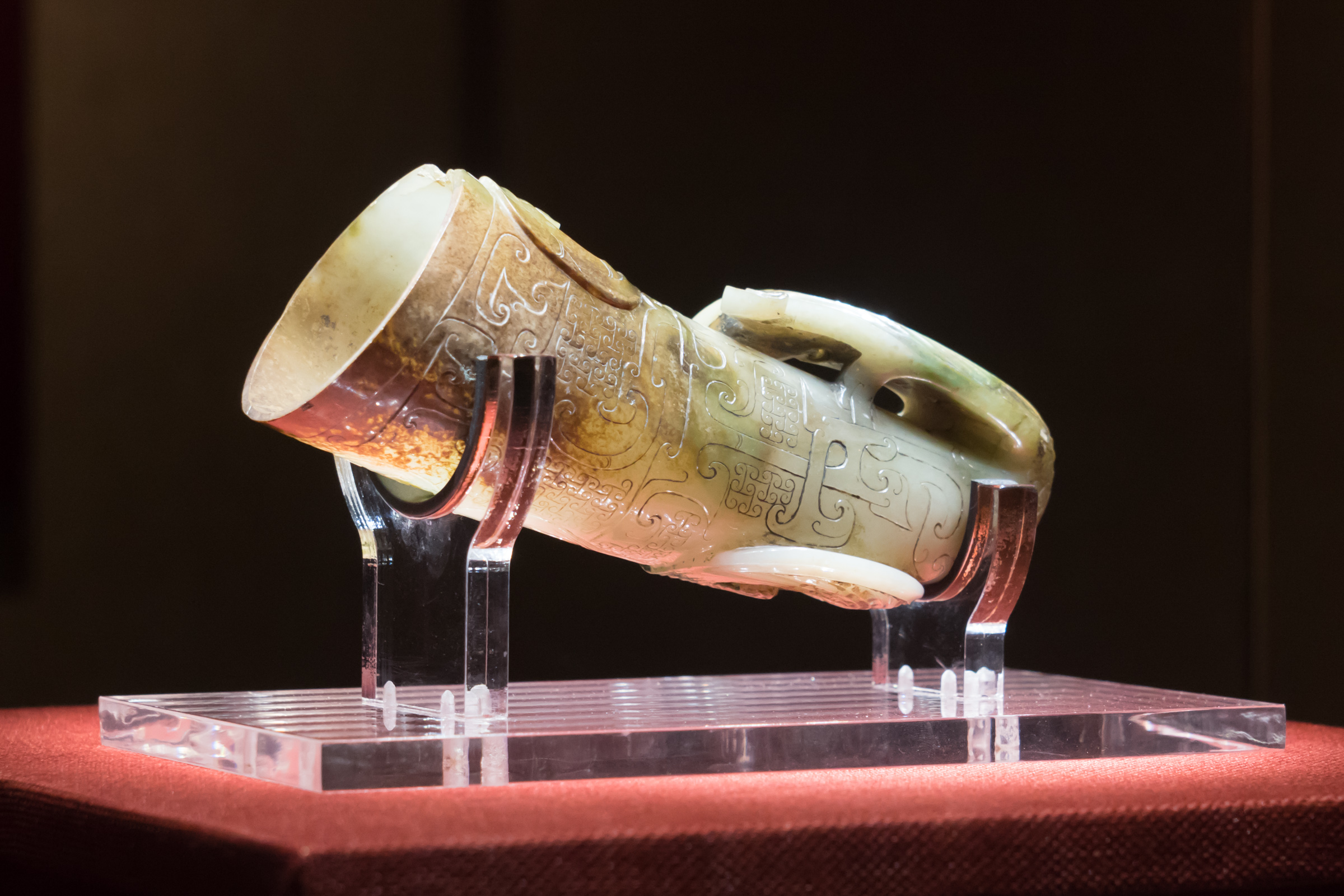
Jade Drinking Vessel in Rhino Horn Shape

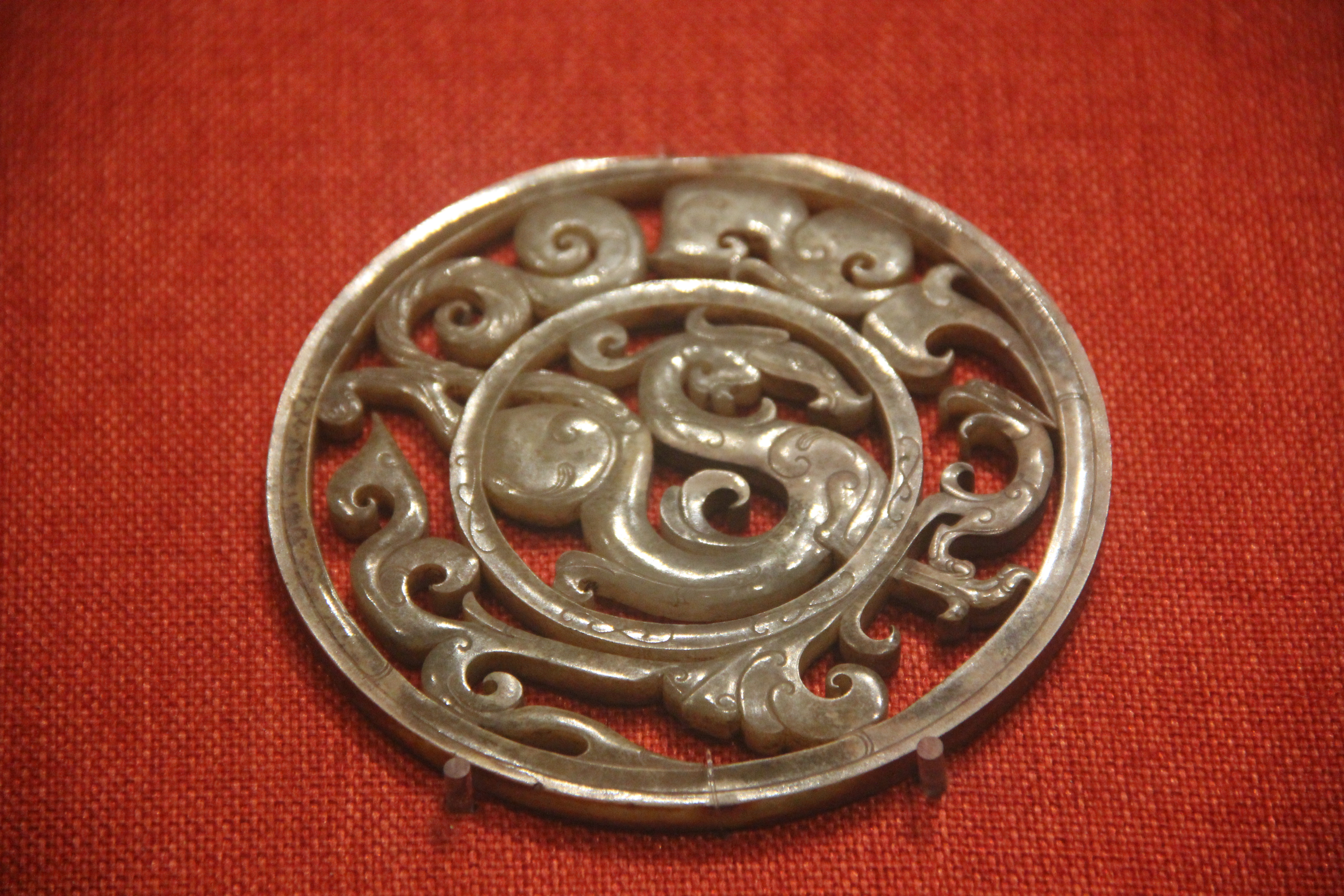
Jade Openwork Disk with Dragon and Phoenix

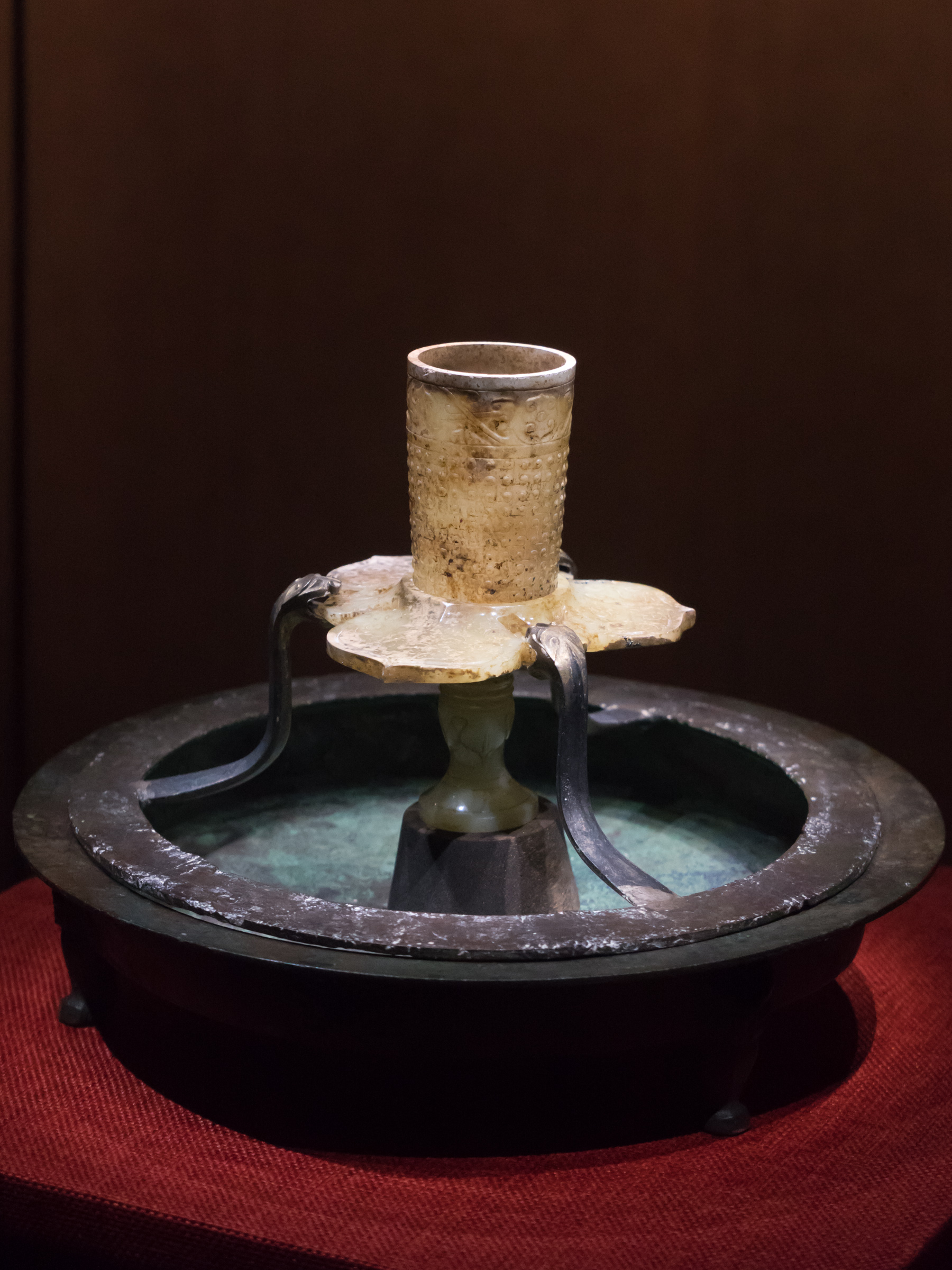
Jade Drinking Cup for Collecting Sweet Dew

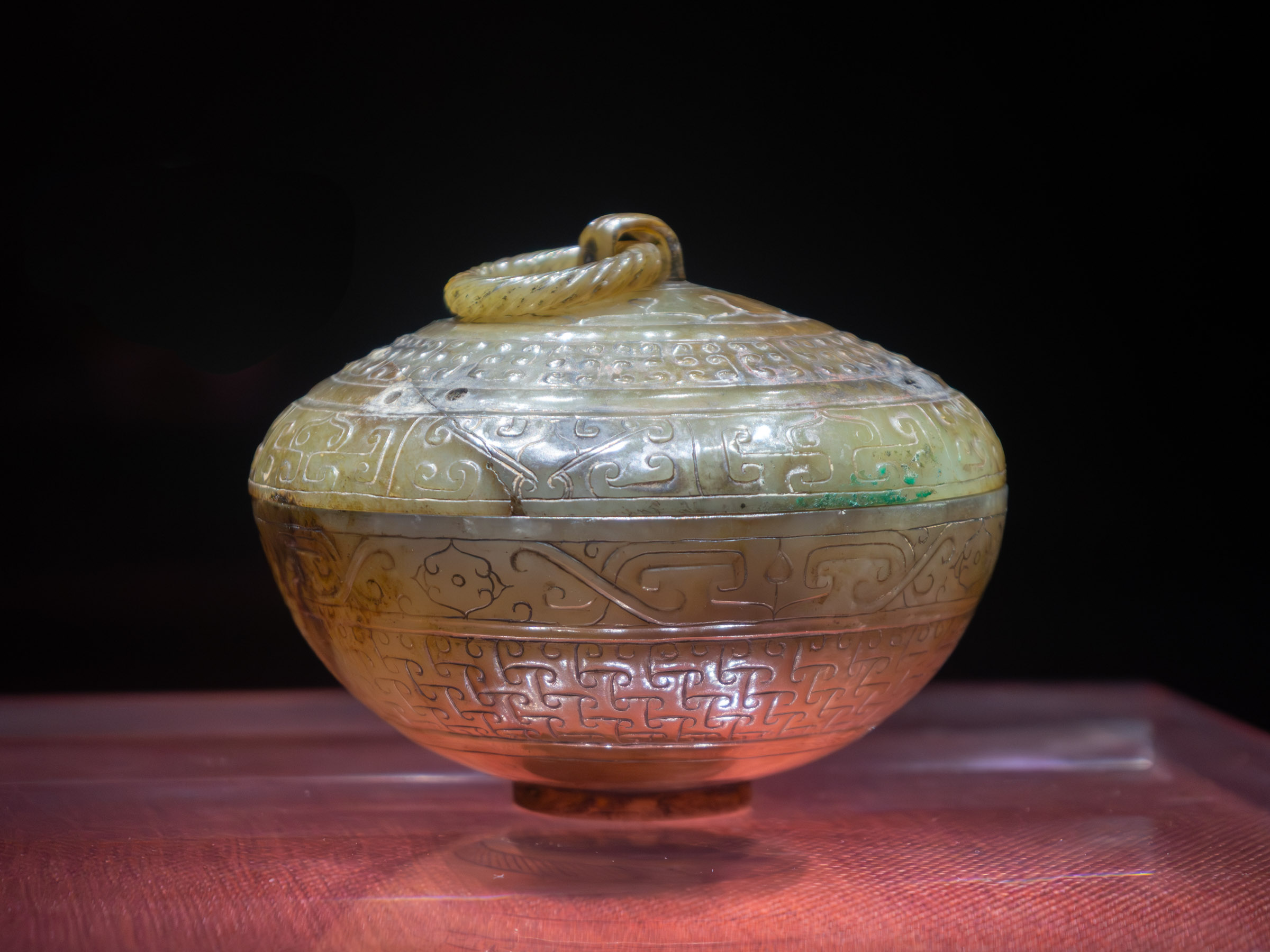
Jade Covered Box

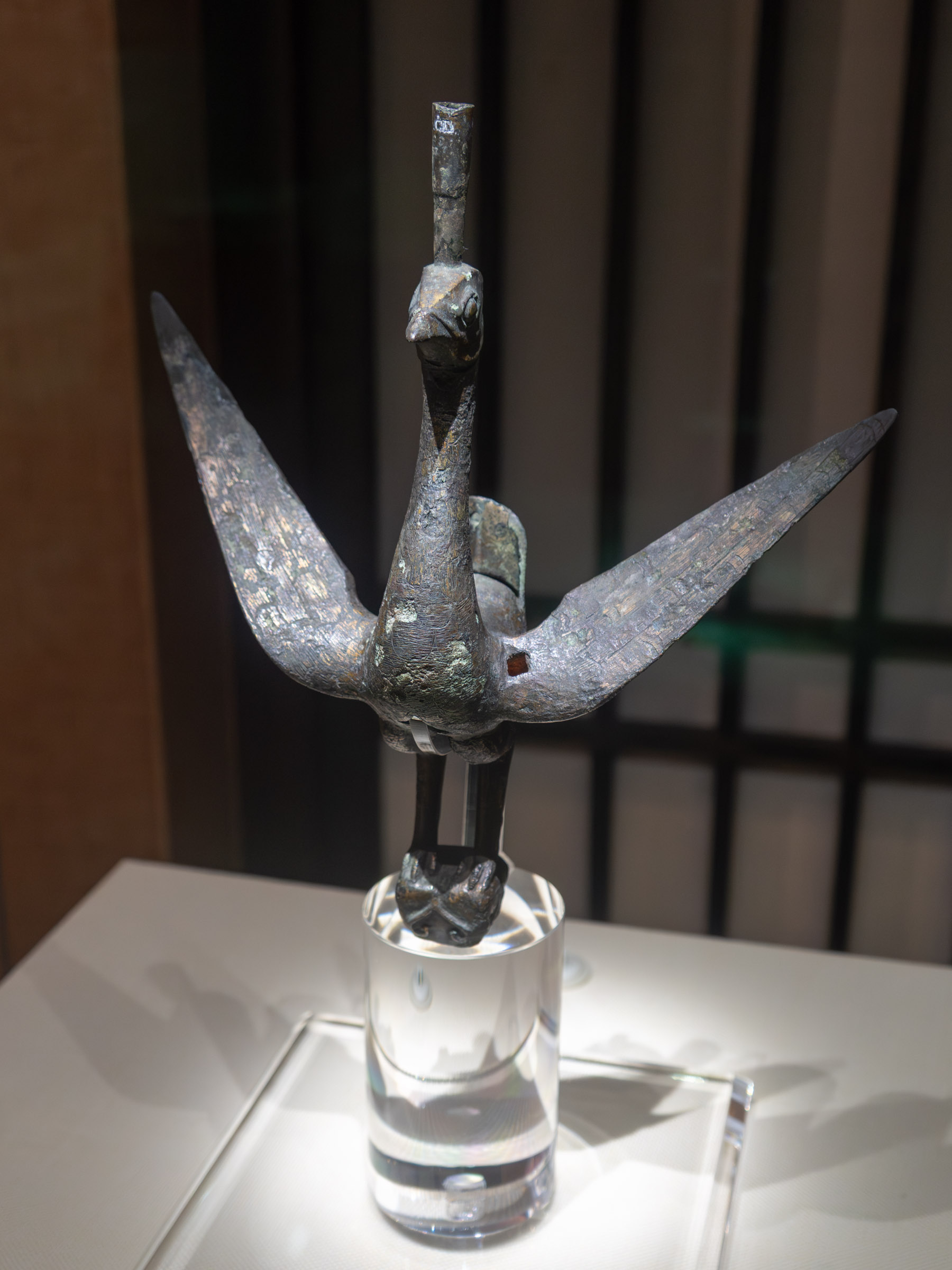
Bronze screen parts

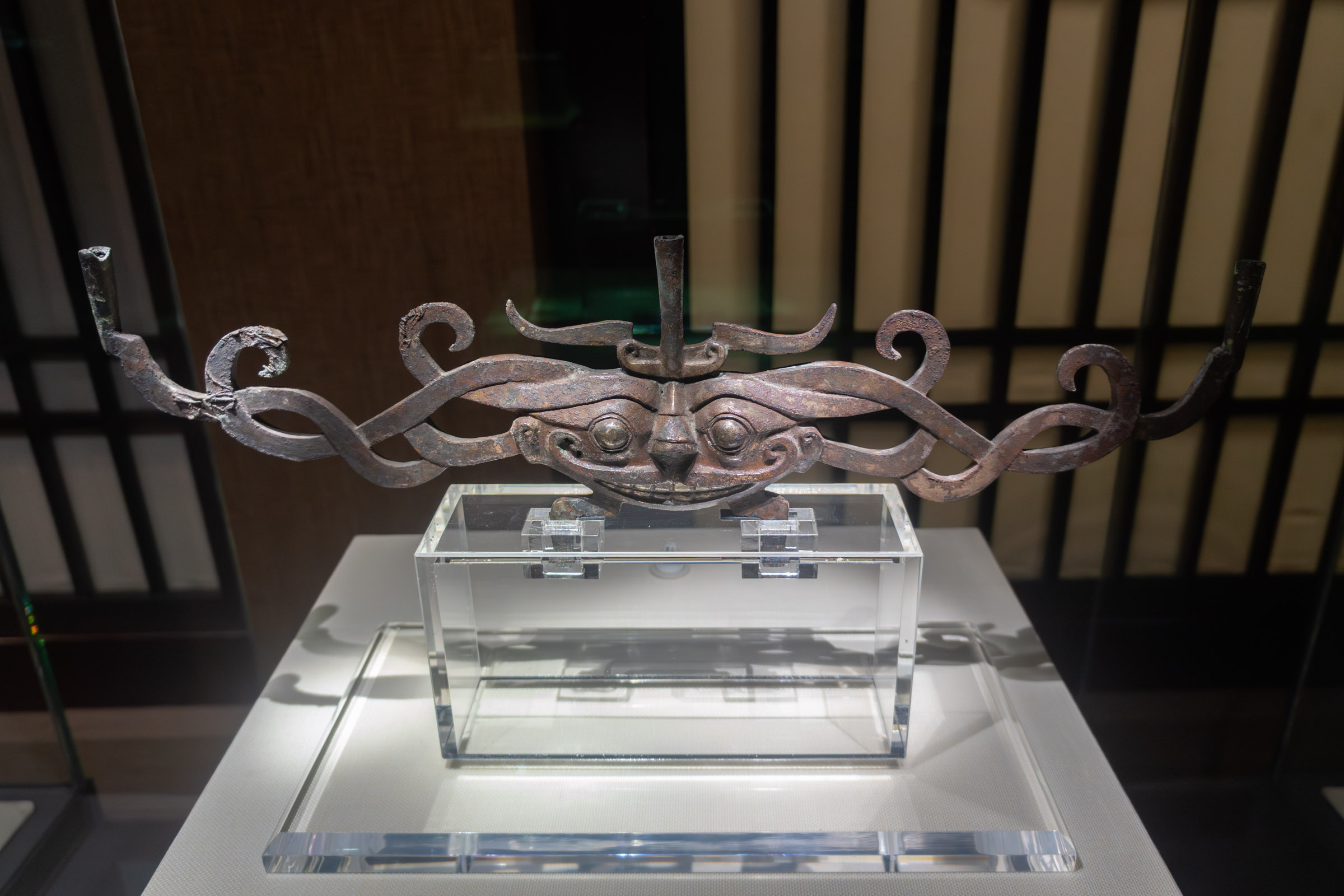
Bronze screen parts

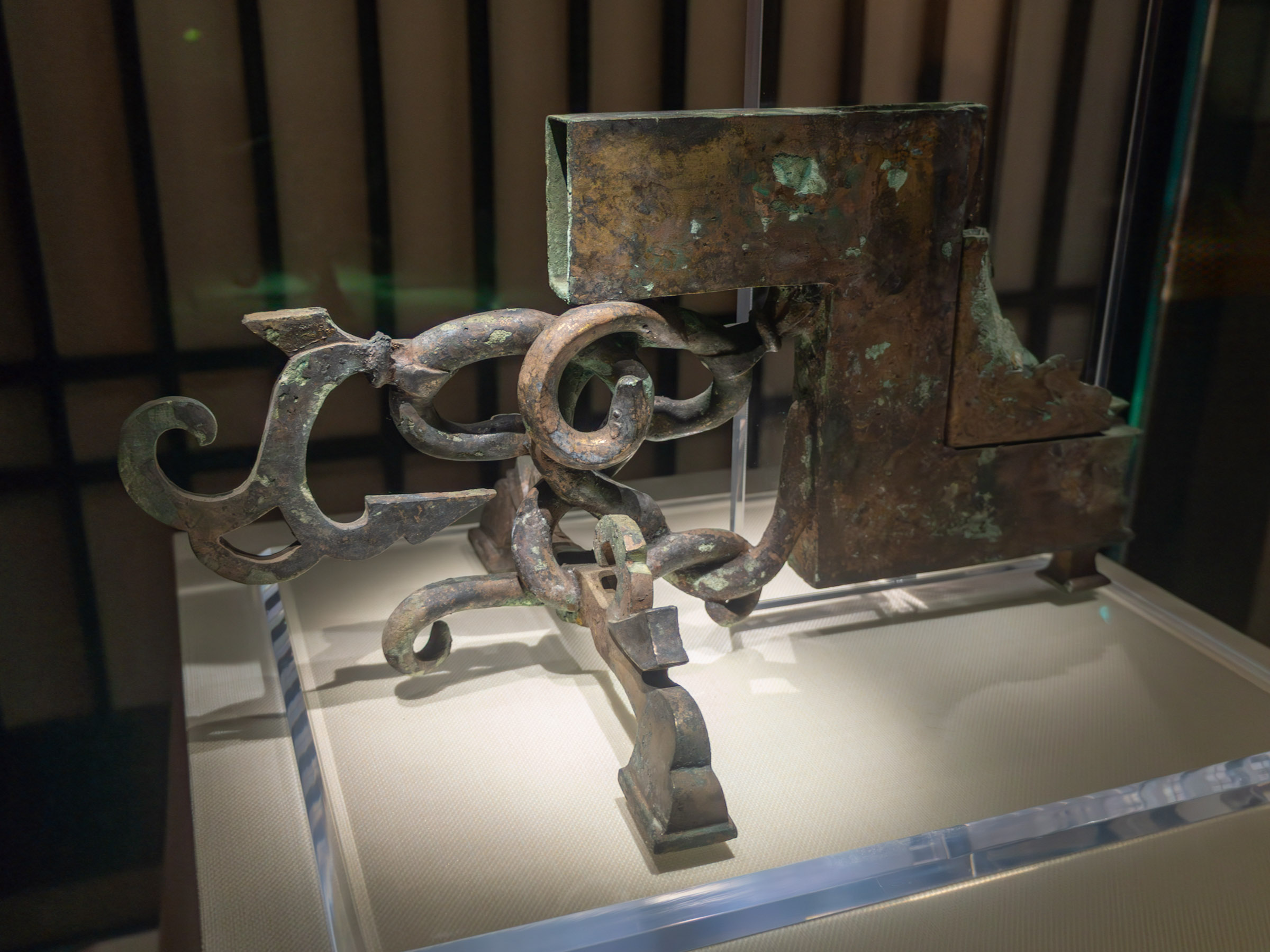
Bronze screen parts

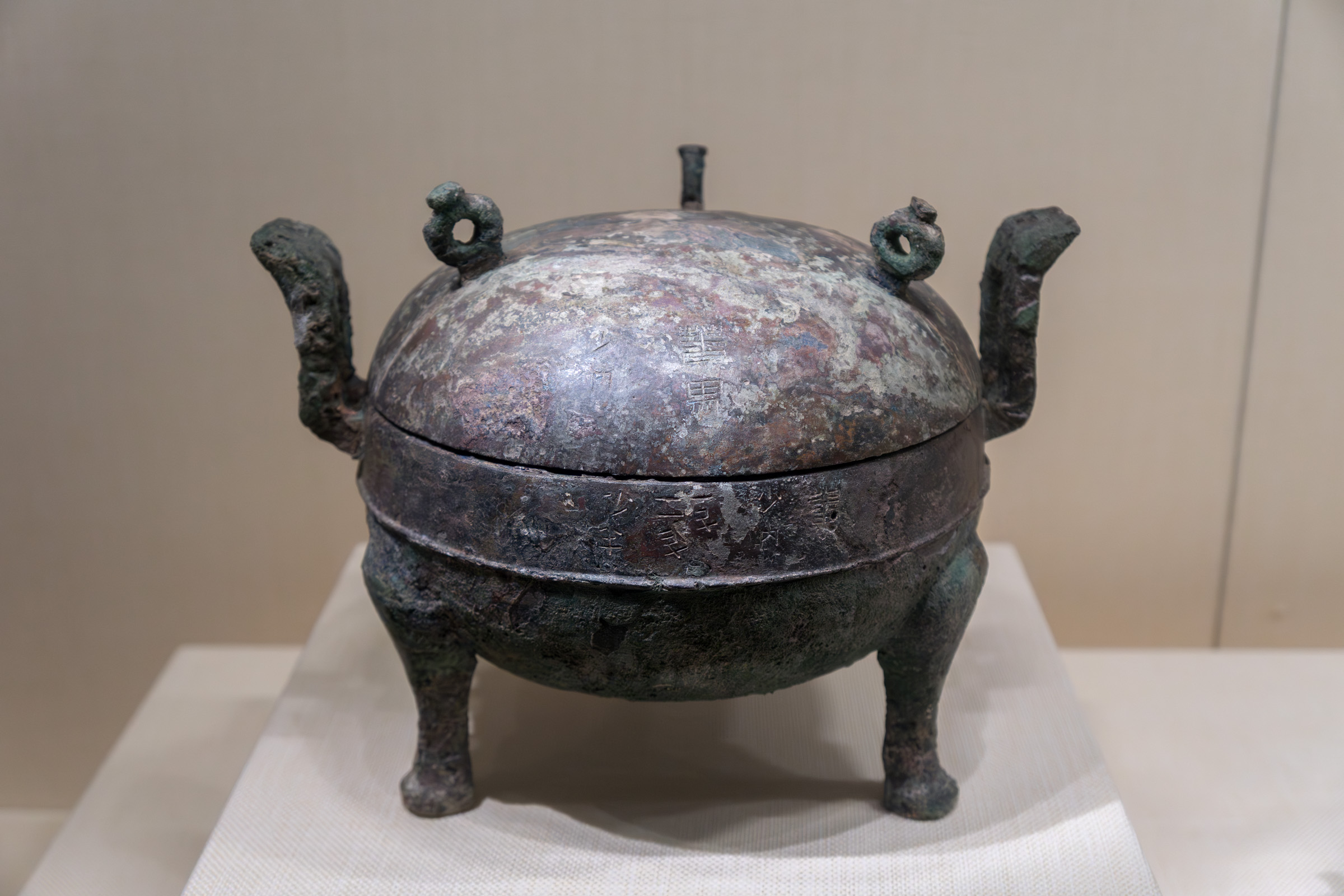
Bronze Tripod Ding

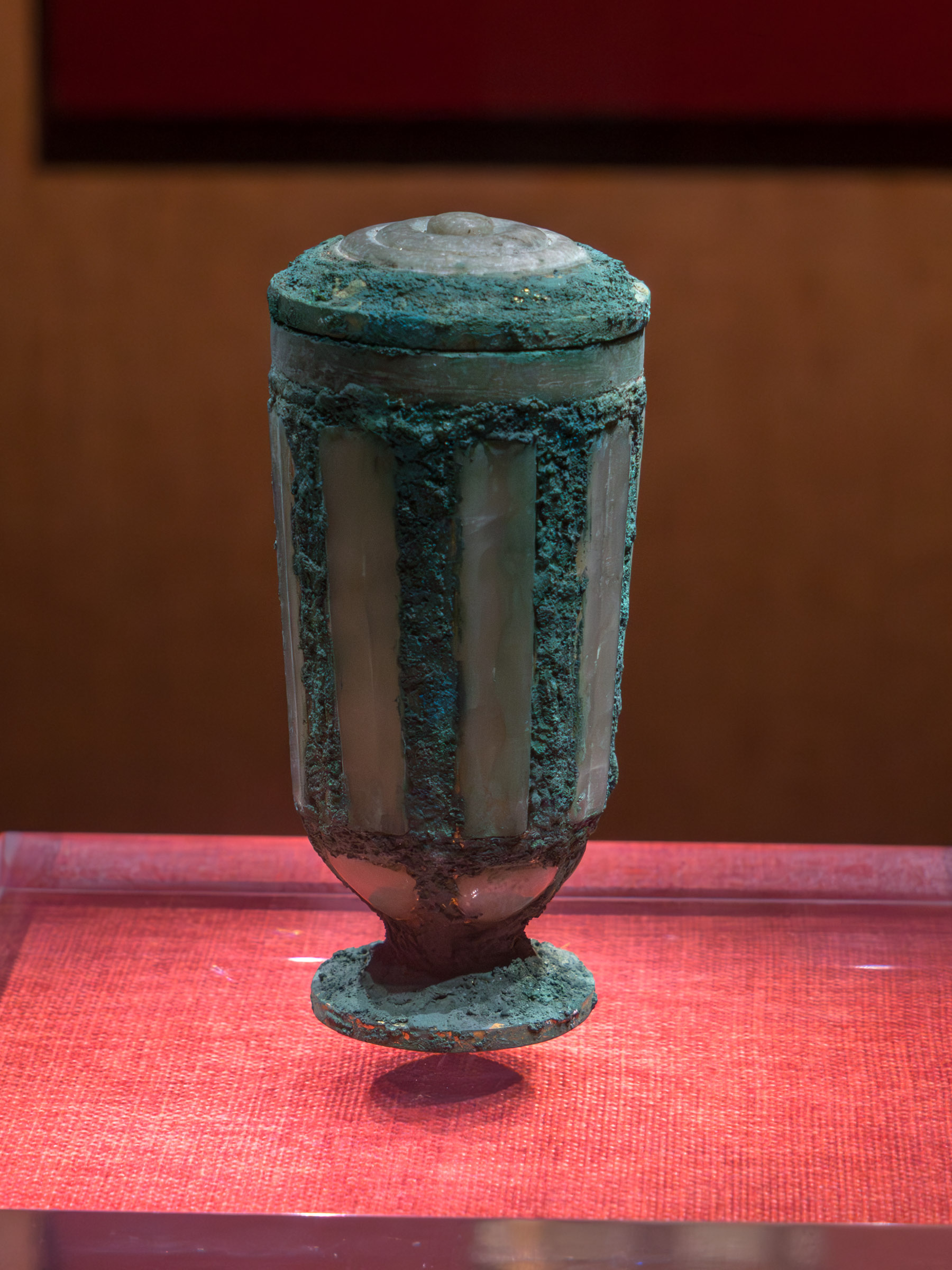
Bronze Beaker Mounted with Jade Plaques

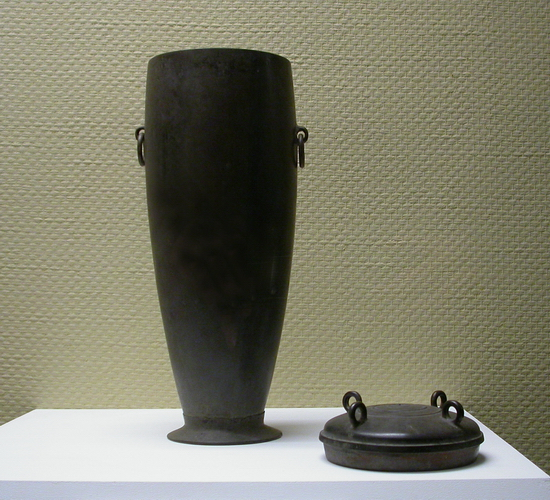
Bronze wine vessel

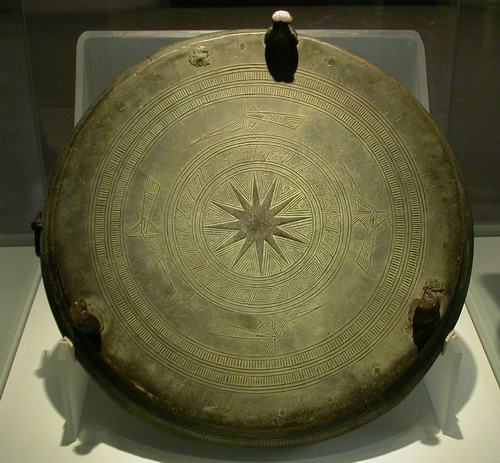
Bronze disk

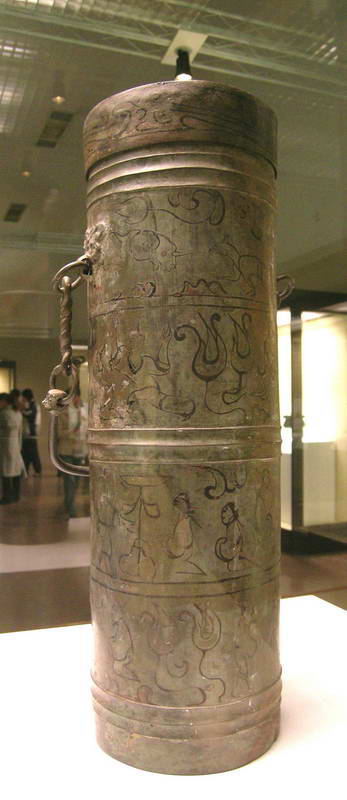
Brozen Canister with lacquer drawing

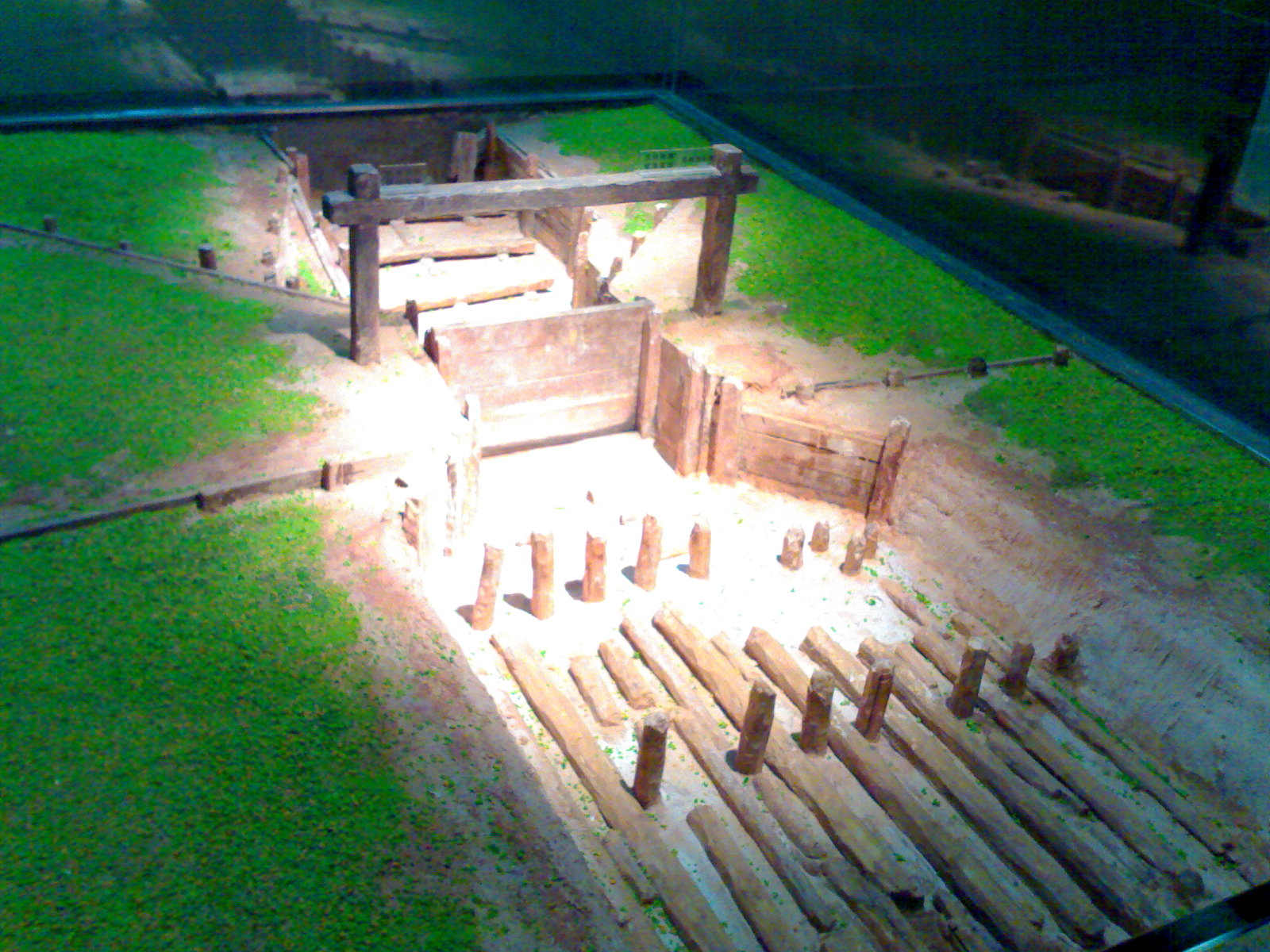
Nanyue Sluice Model

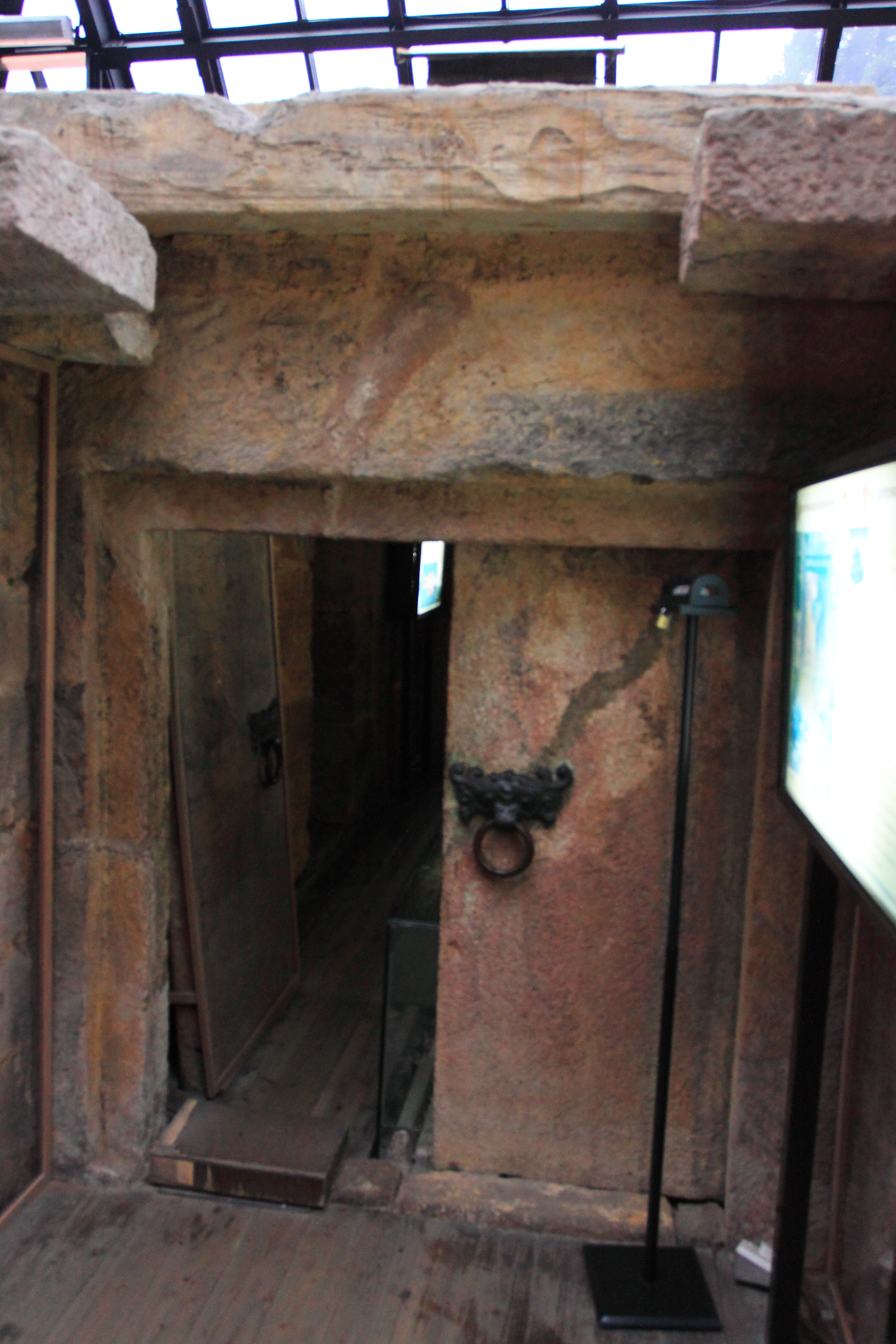
Mausoleum of King Triệu Mạt (Zhao Mo)

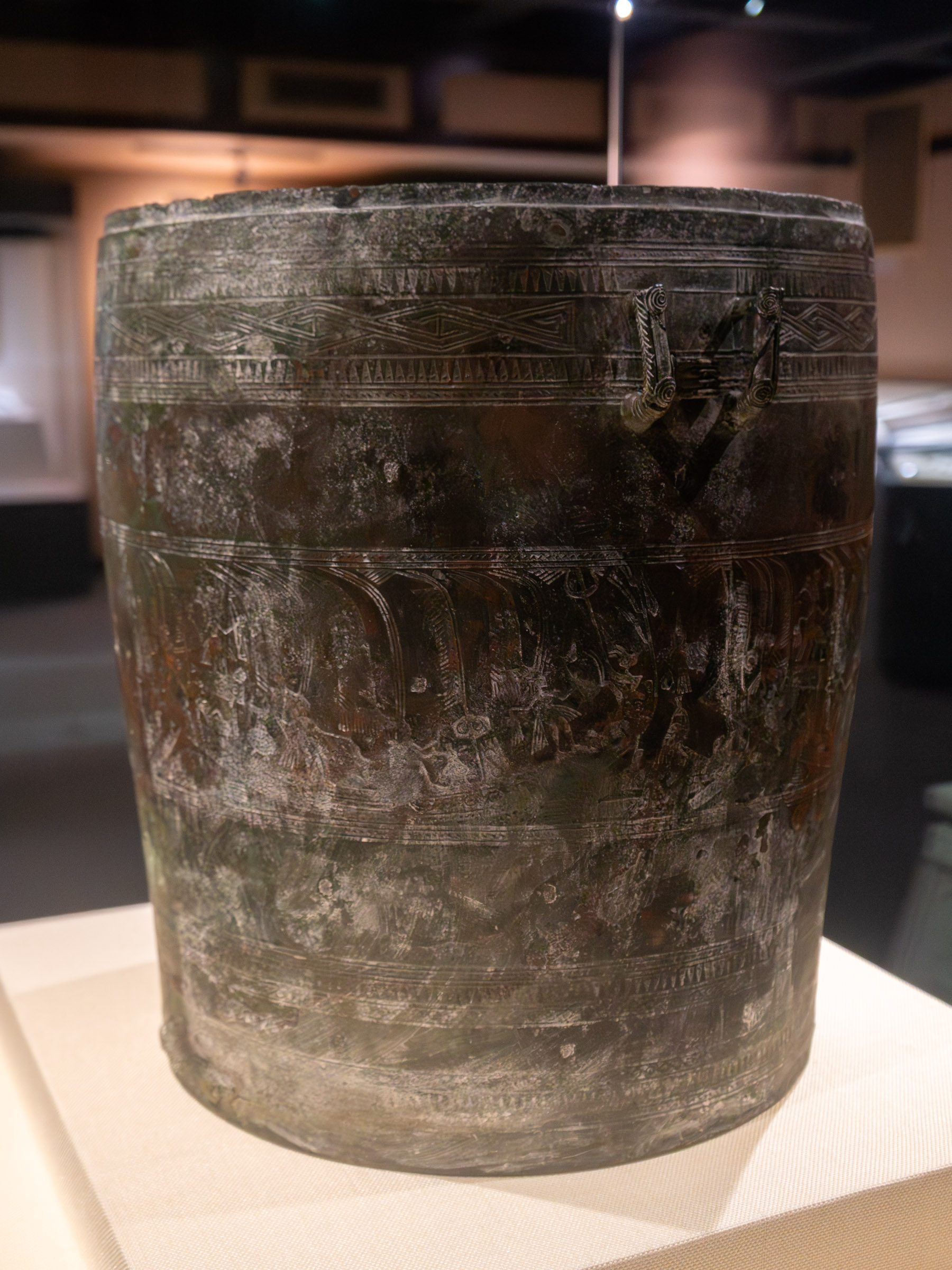
Đông Sơn bronze jar

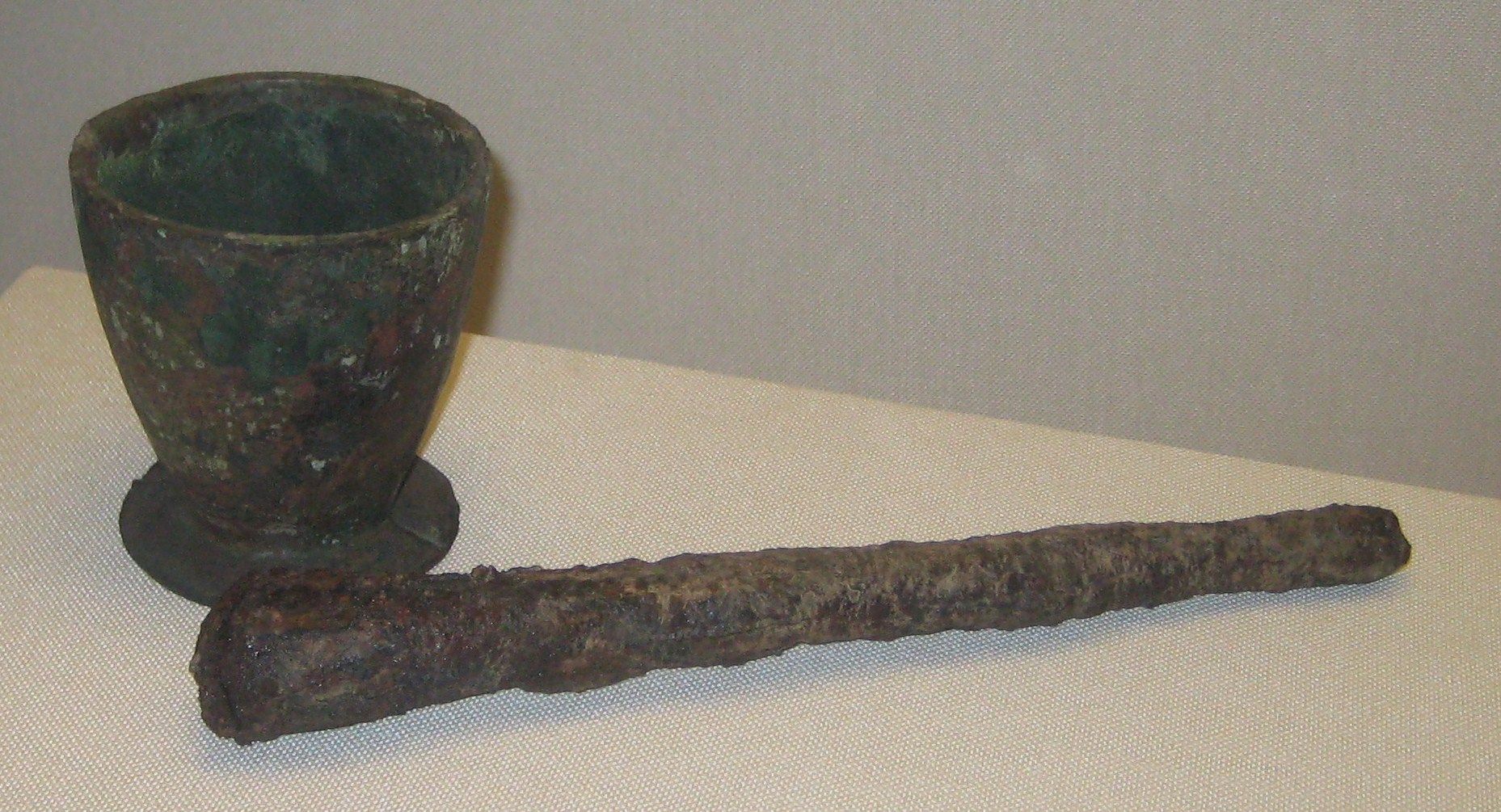
Bronze mortar and pestle

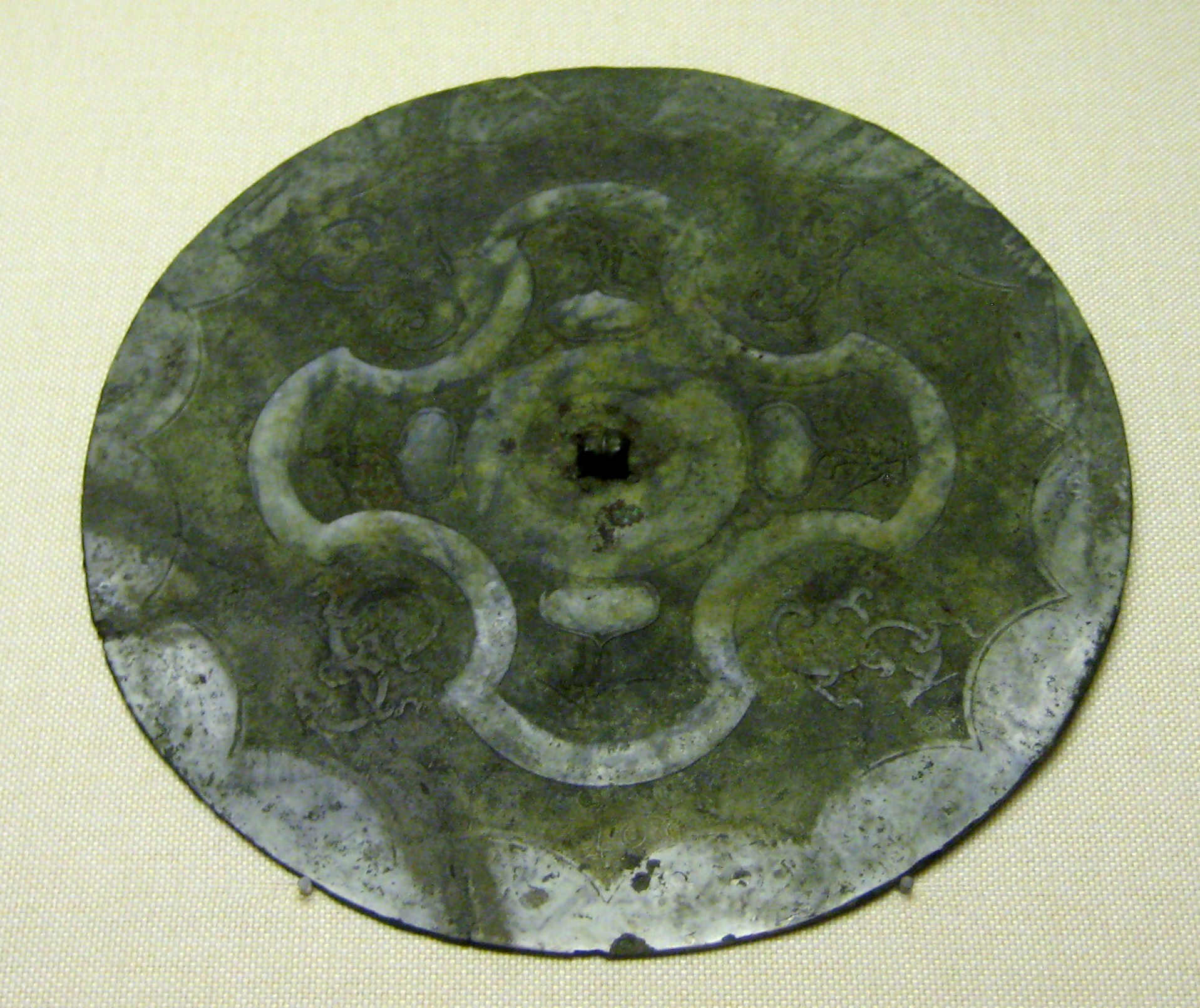
Bronze mirror inlaid with silver

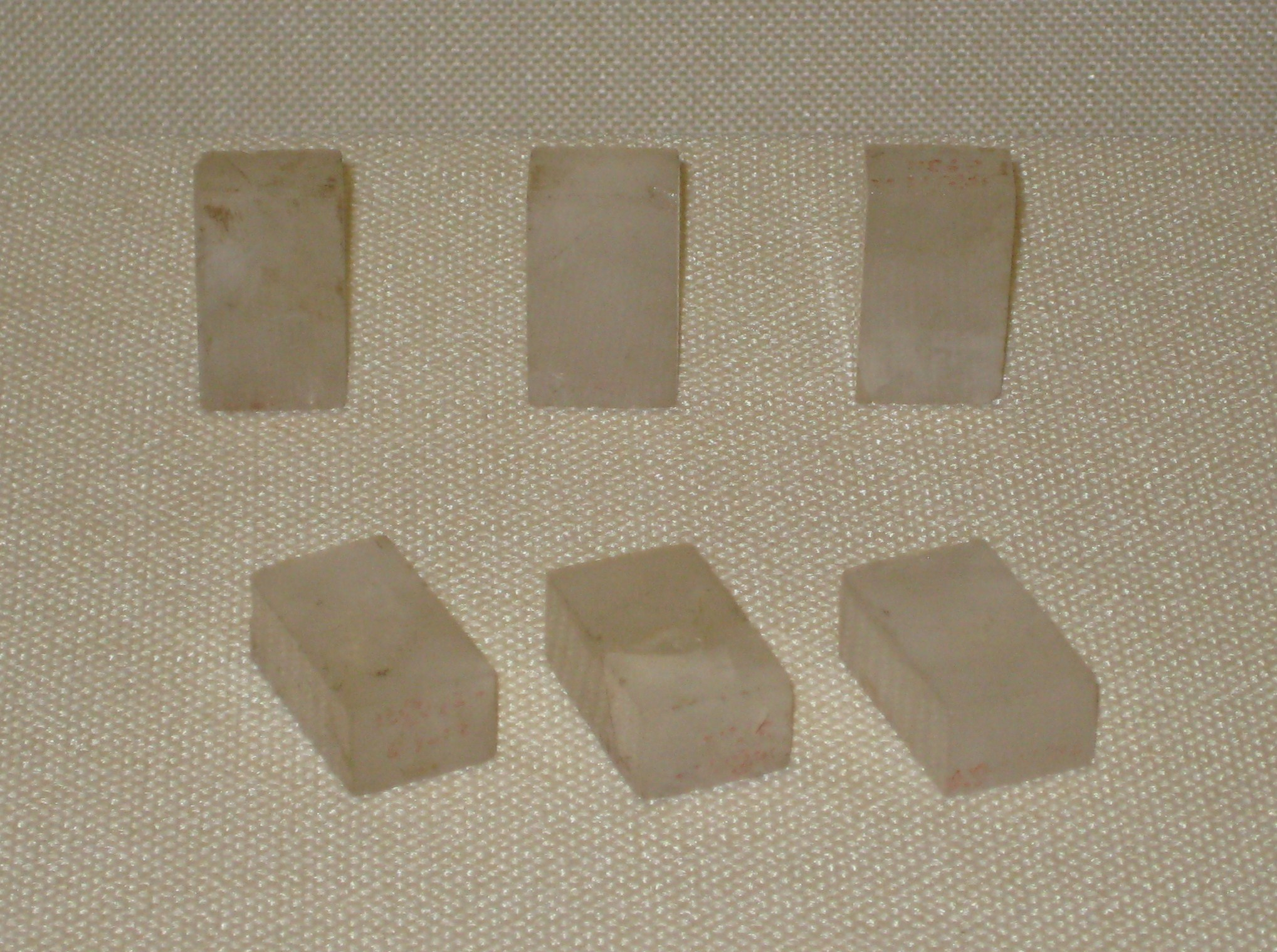
Game of Liubo

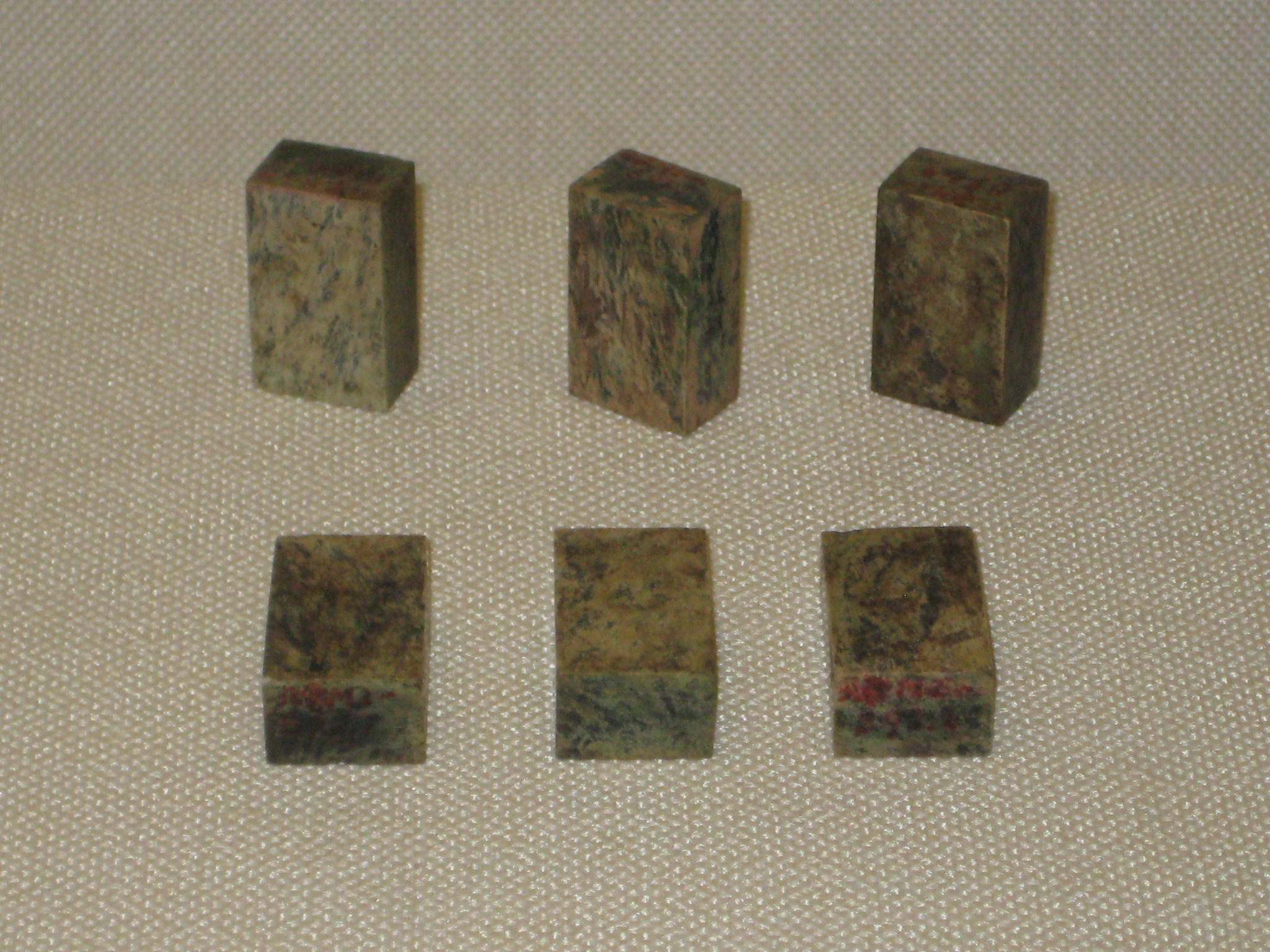
Game of Liubo

== See also ==
- Triệu dynasty
- Zhao Tuo
- Panyu District
- Trọng Thủy
- Han–Nanyue War
- Âu Lạc
- Nanyue King Museum
- Tây Vu Vương
- Đông Sơn culture
- Minyue
- Yelang
- Baiyue

Preceded by Qin dynasty Thục dynasty	Dynasties in history of Lingnan; 204–111 BC	Succeeded by Han dynasty
