= Trọng Thủy =

Triệu Trọng Thủy 趙仲始
- Prince of Nanyue; Prince Consort of Âu Lạc
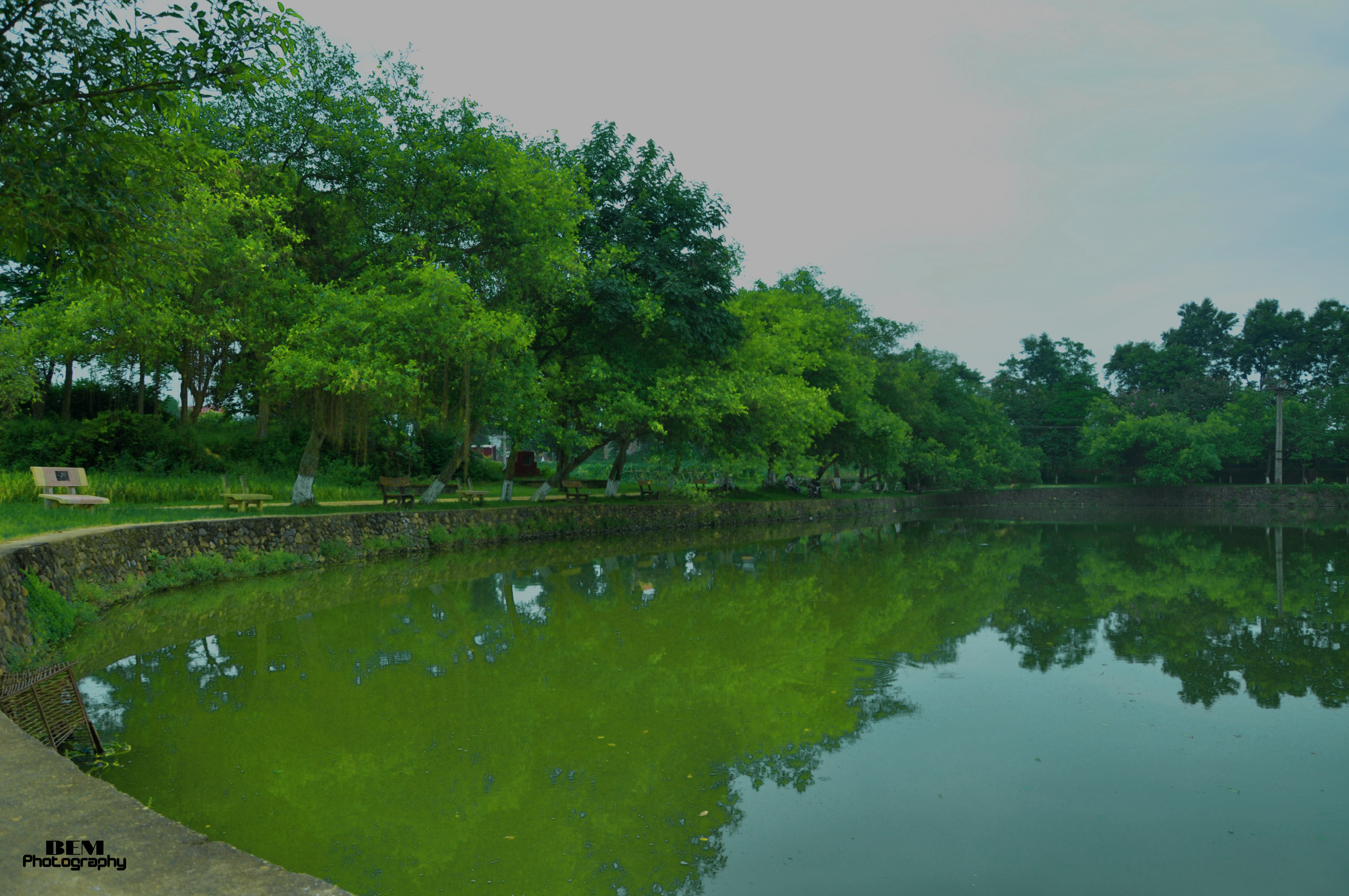
- Trọng Thủy's well at the Cổ Loa Citadel site today

Crown Prince of Nanyue
- Successor: Triệu Mạt (succeeded Triệu Đà)
- Born: Unknown; Nanyue
- Died: 208 BC or 179 BC (traditional legend); Before 137 BC (modern historiography); Cổ Loa, Âu Lạc (according to legend)
- Spouse: Mỵ Châu; Unnamed wife (mother of Triệu Mạt)
- Issue: Triệu Mạt
- House: Triệu dynasty
- Father: Triệu Đà (Emperor Wu)
- Mother: Unknown
- Occupation: Prince, Military Commander, Royal Guard

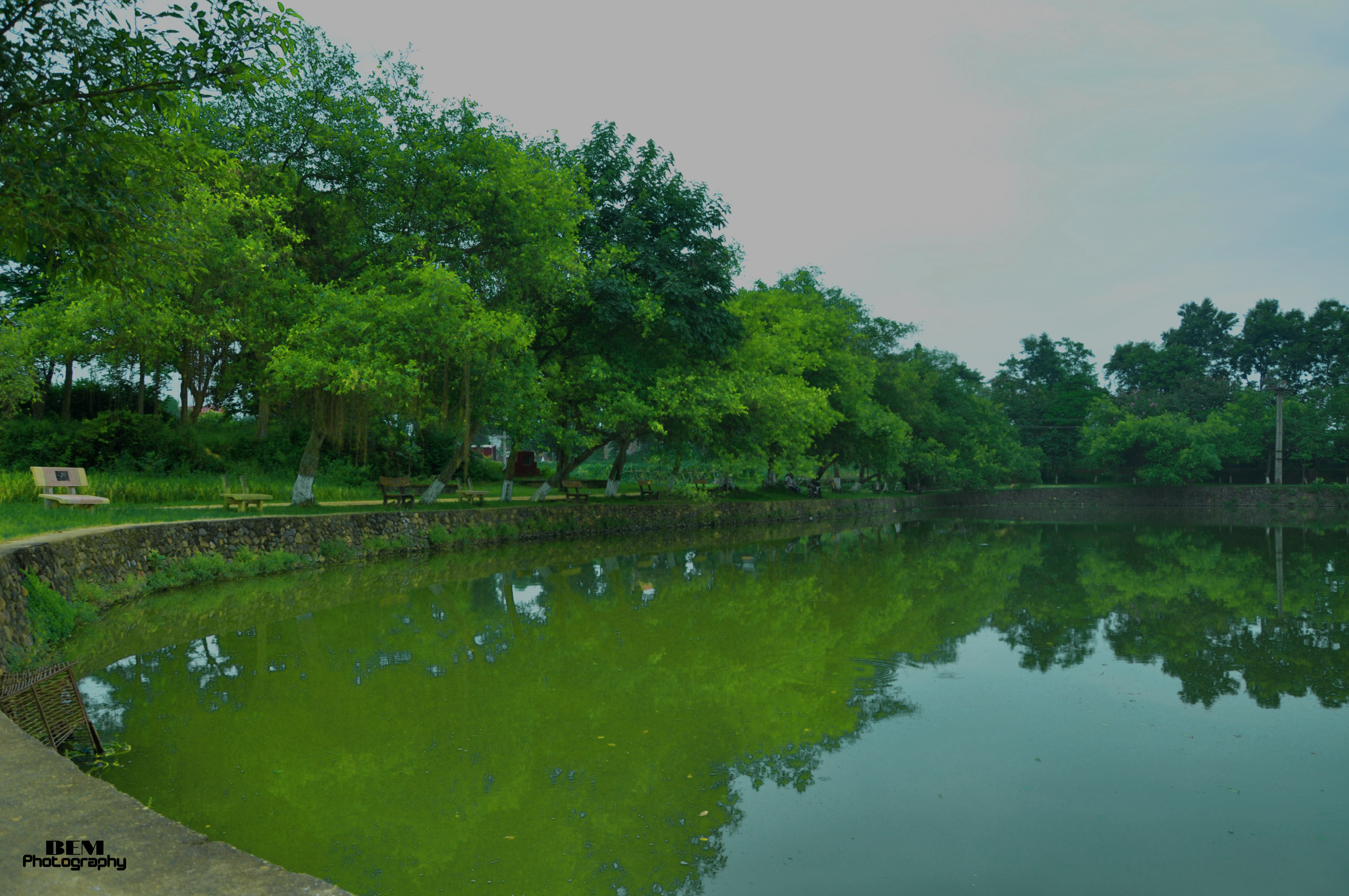
The well of Trọng Thủy - Mỵ Châu at Cổ Loa, where Trọng Thủy committed suicide

Trọng Thủy (Chinese: 仲始), full name Triệu Trọng Thủy (Chinese: 趙仲始, Zhào Zhòngshǐ), was a prince of Nanyue, the son of Triệu Đà (Zhao Tuo), and the husband of Princess Mỵ Châu, making him a prince consort of Âu Lạc.

== Son-in-law of Âu Lạc ==
According to the Đại Việt sử ký toàn thư and Khâm định Việt sử thông giám cương mục, after failing to defeat An Dương Vương in several military campaigns, Triệu Đà sent Trọng Thủy to Âu Lạc to serve as a royal guard in An Dương Vương's court and seek a marriage alliance with Princess Mỵ Châu. An Dương Vương agreed and allowed Trọng Thủy to marry his daughter.

According to legend, Trọng Thủy coaxed Mỵ Châu into letting him secretly inspect the "magic crossbow" (nỏ thần), then stealthily broke its trigger mechanism (made from the claw of the Golden Turtle deity, Kim Quy) and replaced it with a fake one.

== Death and historical discrepancies ==
Triệu Đà subsequently launched another invasion of Âu Lạc, placing Trọng Thủy in command of the army. The Đại Việt sử ký toàn thư records this event as taking place in 208 BC. According to legend, An Dương Vương was overconfident because of his magic crossbow; only when entering battle did he realize the weapon no longer worked. Defeated, he fled south with Mỵ Châu. Following the instructions he had given Mỵ Châu before they parted, Trọng Thủy tracked the trail of goose feathers that she scattered along the road. Realizing that his own daughter had inadvertently aided the Triệu enemy, An Dương Vương executed Mỵ Châu and committed suicide (another version states that after killing Mỵ Châu, the king followed the Golden Turtle into the sea and disappeared). When Trọng Thủy arrived and found Mỵ Châu dead, he wept in grief and brought her body back for burial at Cổ Loa Citadel. Consumed by remorse and longing for Mỵ Châu, he returned to the place where she used to bathe and dress, and ultimately threw himself into a well and died.

Two 14th-century works from the Trần dynasty, the Đại Việt sử lược and An Nam chí lược, contain brief accounts of Mỵ Châu's story, neither of which mentions the detail of scattering goose feathers. Furthermore, there is no historical evidence confirming how Trọng Thủy actually died (whether by suicide, assassination, or natural causes).

Also according to the Đại Việt sử ký toàn thư, Trọng Thủy had a son named Triệu Hồ (Zhao Mo), who later succeeded Triệu Đà in 137 BC and died in 125 BC at the age of 52. This implies that Triệu Hồ was born in 176 BC, meaning Trọng Thủy must have lived at least until 177 BC. Triệu Hồ was certainly the son of another wife, not Mỵ Châu.

The accounts in the Đại Việt sử ký toàn thư regarding Trọng Thủy's life are legendary and chronologically inconsistent: on one hand, he is said to have died immediately after the fall of Âu Lạc (208 BC), yet on the other hand, he fathered a son 32 years later (176 BC).

Modern Vietnamese historians, basing their research on Sima Qian's Records of the Grand Historian (Shiji), date Nanyue's conquest of Âu Lạc to around 179 BC. Even so, if Trọng Thủy had died alongside Mỵ Châu at that time, he still could not have fathered Triệu Hồ, as there is a four-year gap between 179 BC and Triệu Hồ's recorded birth year.

On the other hand, archaeological findings from the Mausoleum of the Nanyue King (Triệu Hồ's tomb) excavated in Guangzhou, Guangdong, indicate that Triệu Hồ died between the ages of 35 and 40, rather than in his 50s as recorded in the Đại Việt sử ký toàn thư. Historians suggest that Triệu Hồ may have been a younger son of Trọng Thủy, while the grandson mentioned by Triệu Đà in his letter to Emperor Wen of Han ("This old man has lived in the Yue lands for 49 years, and by now already holds grandchildren in his arms") was an older son born before Triệu Hồ. Under the hypothesis that Triệu Hồ died in 125 BC at the age of 35–40, Trọng Thủy must have lived at least until 164–159 BC and died sometime before 137 BC (the year of Triệu Đà's death), thus never ascending the throne himself.

Sima Qian's Records of the Grand Historian only notes that Triệu Hồ was Triệu Đà's grandson, without mentioning Trọng Thủy by name. Vietnamese historical texts that mention Trọng Thủy do not record any other sons of Triệu Đà. The Khâm định Việt sử thông giám cương mục of the Nguyễn dynasty, compiled after the Later Lê dynasty's Đại Việt sử ký toàn thư, only mentions Trọng Thủy marrying into An Dương Vương's family and swapping the magic crossbow, omitting both his suicide after Mỵ Châu's death and Triệu Hồ's lifespan.

== See also ==
- Nanyue
- Triệu dynasty
- Zhao Tuo
- Panyu District
- An Dương Vương
- Âu Lạc
- Baiyue
- Mỵ Châu
- Zhao Mo

== Sources ==
- Đại Việt sử ký toàn thư, Annals of the Thục Dynasty, Annals of the Triệu Dynasty
- Khâm định Việt sử thông giám cương mục, Annals of the Triệu Dynasty
- Phan Huy Lê, Trần Quốc Vượng, Hà Văn Tấn, Lương Ninh (1991), Lịch sử Việt Nam, tập 1 (History of Vietnam, Vol. 1), Nhà xuất bản Đại học và giáo dục chuyên nghiệp
- Đào Duy Anh (2005), Lịch sử cổ đại Việt Nam (Ancient History of Vietnam), Nhà xuất bản Văn hóa thông tin
- Nguyễn Việt (2010), Hà Nội thời tiền Thăng Long (Hanoi in the Pre-Thăng Long Era), Nhà xuất bản Hà Nội
- Sima Qian, Records of the Grand Historian (Shiji), Vol. 113: "Account of Nanyue" (Nan Yue liezhuan)
