= Trivet =

Object placed between a serving dish or bowl, and a dining table

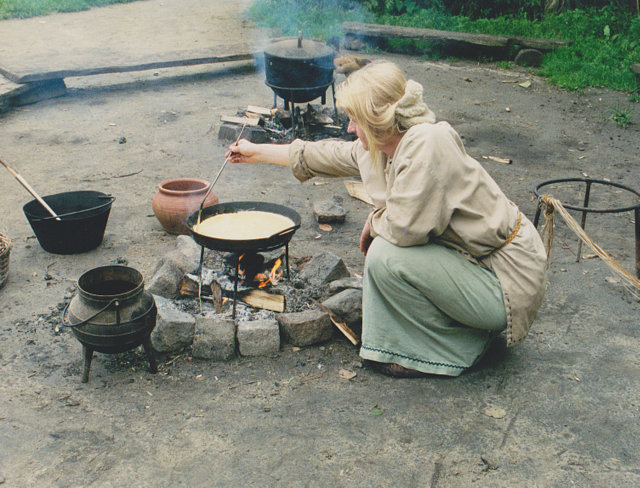
Reconstruction of Iron-age European cookery, using pots suspended in trivets over an open fire

A trivet (Note: Also known as a coaster, pot coaster or hot pad in some regions) (/ˈtrɪvɪt/) is an object placed between a serving dish, bowl, pot, or pan and a dining table, usually to protect the table from heat damage. The word trivet refers to three feet, but the term is sometimes used in British English to refer to trivets with four feet or no feet.

Trivet also refers to a tripod used to elevate pots from the coals of an open fire (the word trivet itself ultimately comes from Latin tripes meaning "tripod"). Metal trivets are often tripod-like structures with three legs to support the trivet horizontally to hold the dish or pot above the table surface. These are often included with modern non-electric pressure cookers. A trivet may often contain a receptacle for a candle that can be lit to keep food warm.

A three-legged design can reduce wobbling on uneven surfaces.

Modern trivets are made from metal, wood, ceramic, fabric, silicone or cork.

When roasting any meat in an oven, trivet racks - which typically fit into roasting pans - are often used to enable the meat joint to be held above the direct heat of the roasting pan and allow the juices of the joint to drip into the roasting pan for the subsequent making of gravy. A trivet can also be made of freshly cut carrot, celery and onion. This not only raises the meat, it has the further advantage of providing a gravy-friendly liquid when the vegetables and juices are sieved at the end of cooking.

== History ==
Trivets have been in use since antiquity, and are sometimes referred to as "fire stands". In the tomb of the Chinese ruler Zhao Mo (2nd century BCE) were found several metal trivets that had been used by him during his lifetime, now stored at the Museum of the Mausoleum of the Nanyue King. Fire-stands were also uncovered at archaeological sites in Israel, dating back to the Philistine time-period (circa 1st millennium BCE).

== See also ==
- Brazier
- Drink coaster
- Gridiron (cooking)
- Pot-holders

== Gallery ==
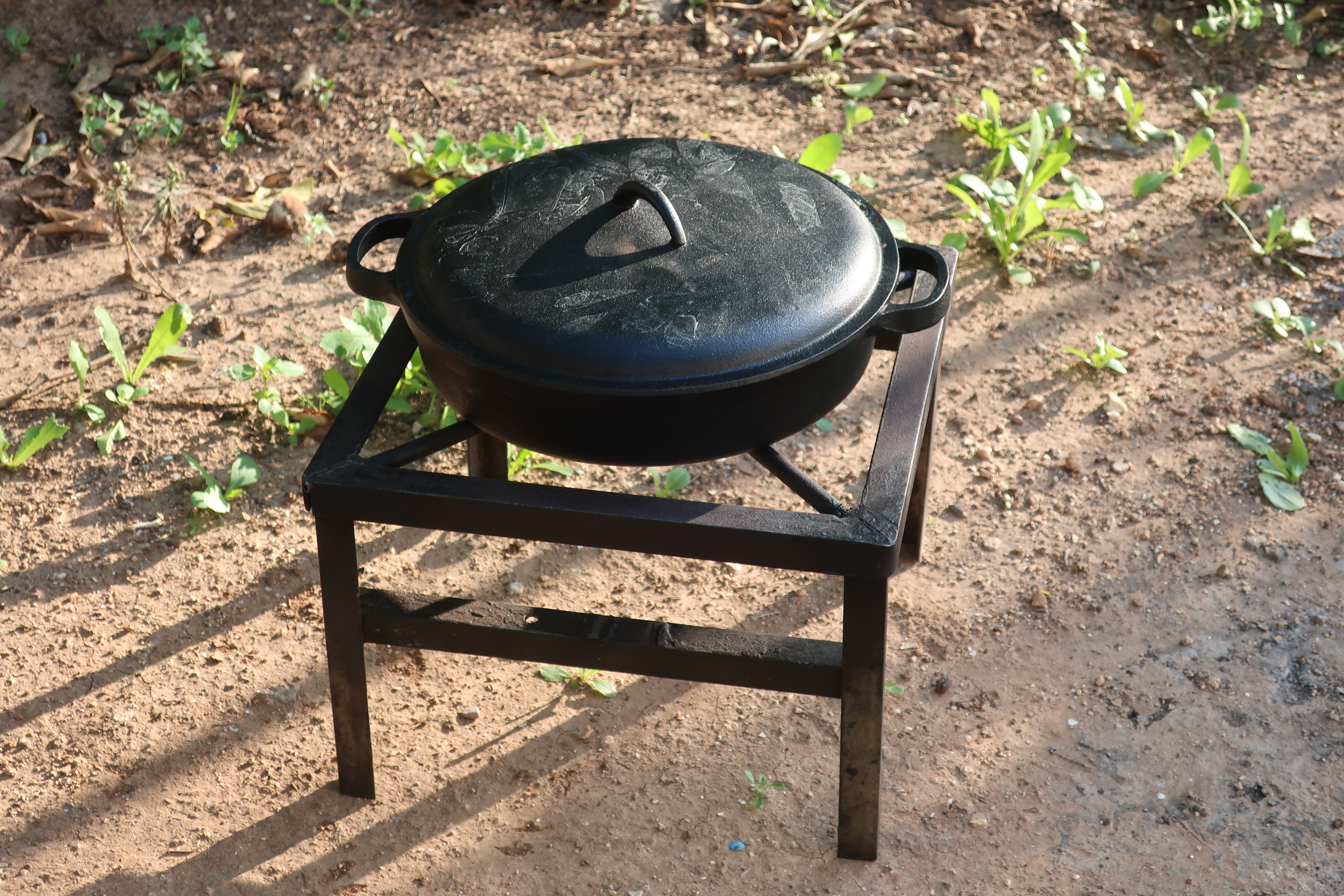
Trivet and cast iron pot

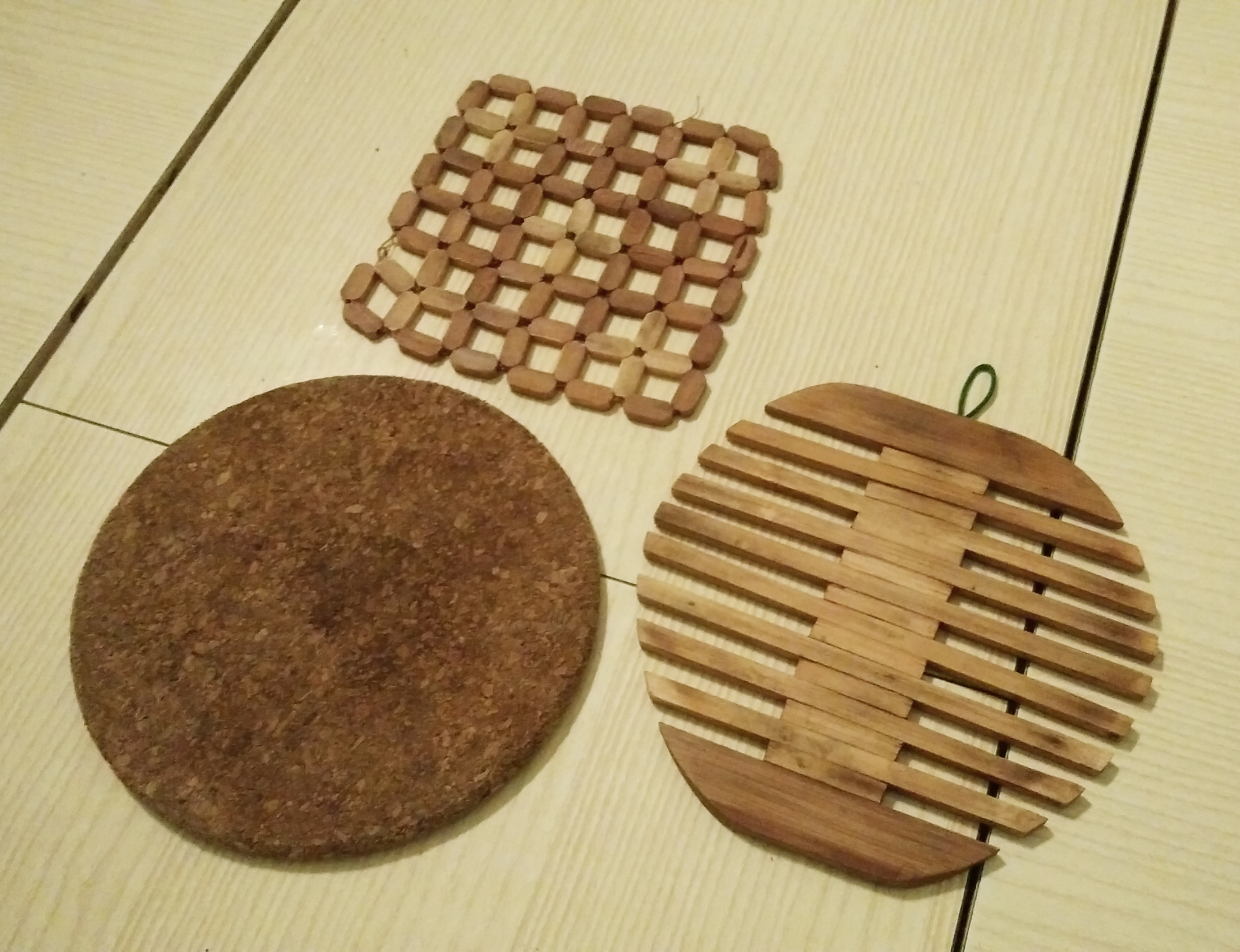
Cork and wood trivets

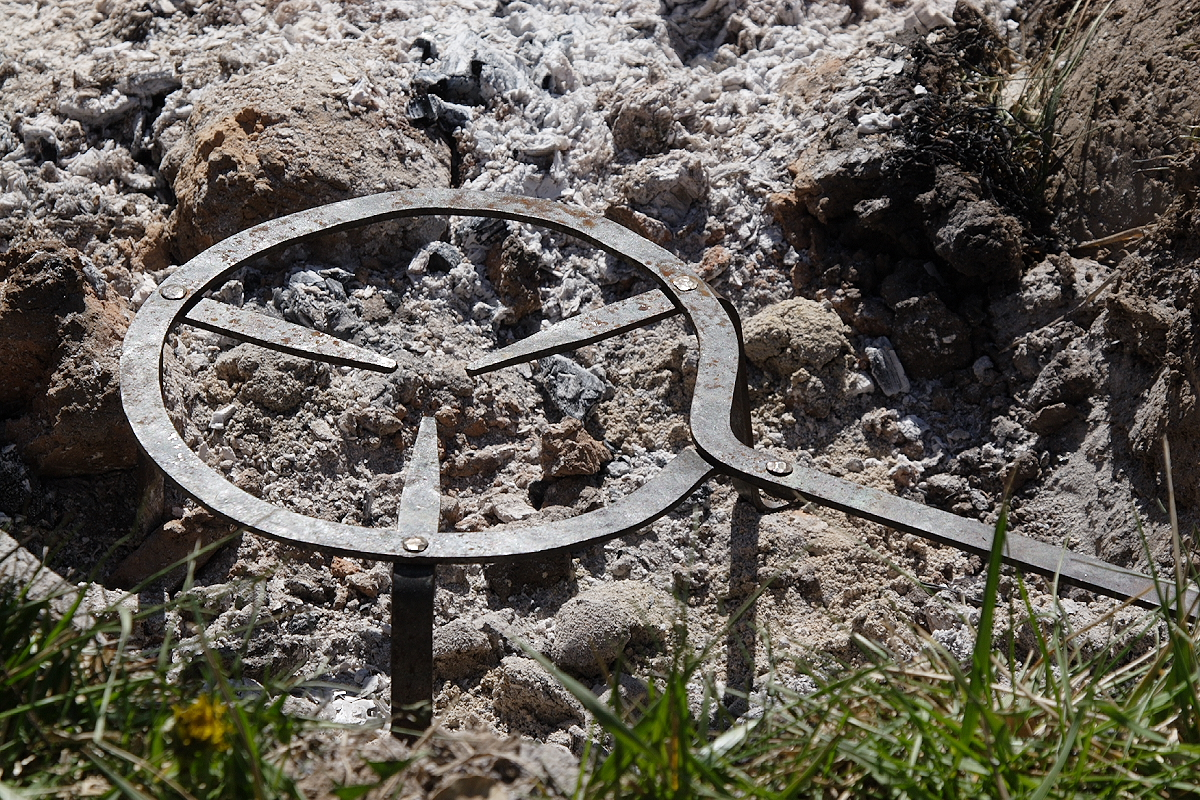
Metal trivet, 19th century replica

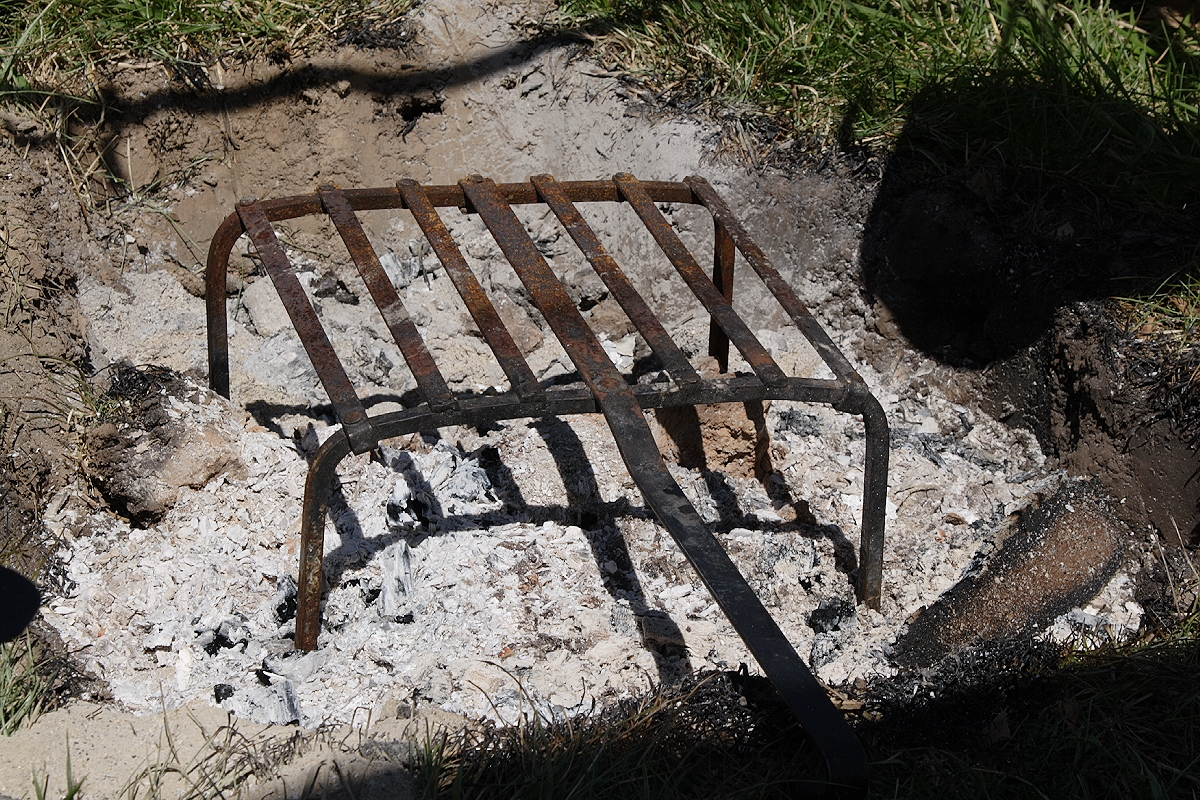
French metal trivet, 19th century replica

Decorative brass trivets by the industrial designer Maurice Ascalon (1913–2003), manufactured by the Pal-Bell Company circa 1940s

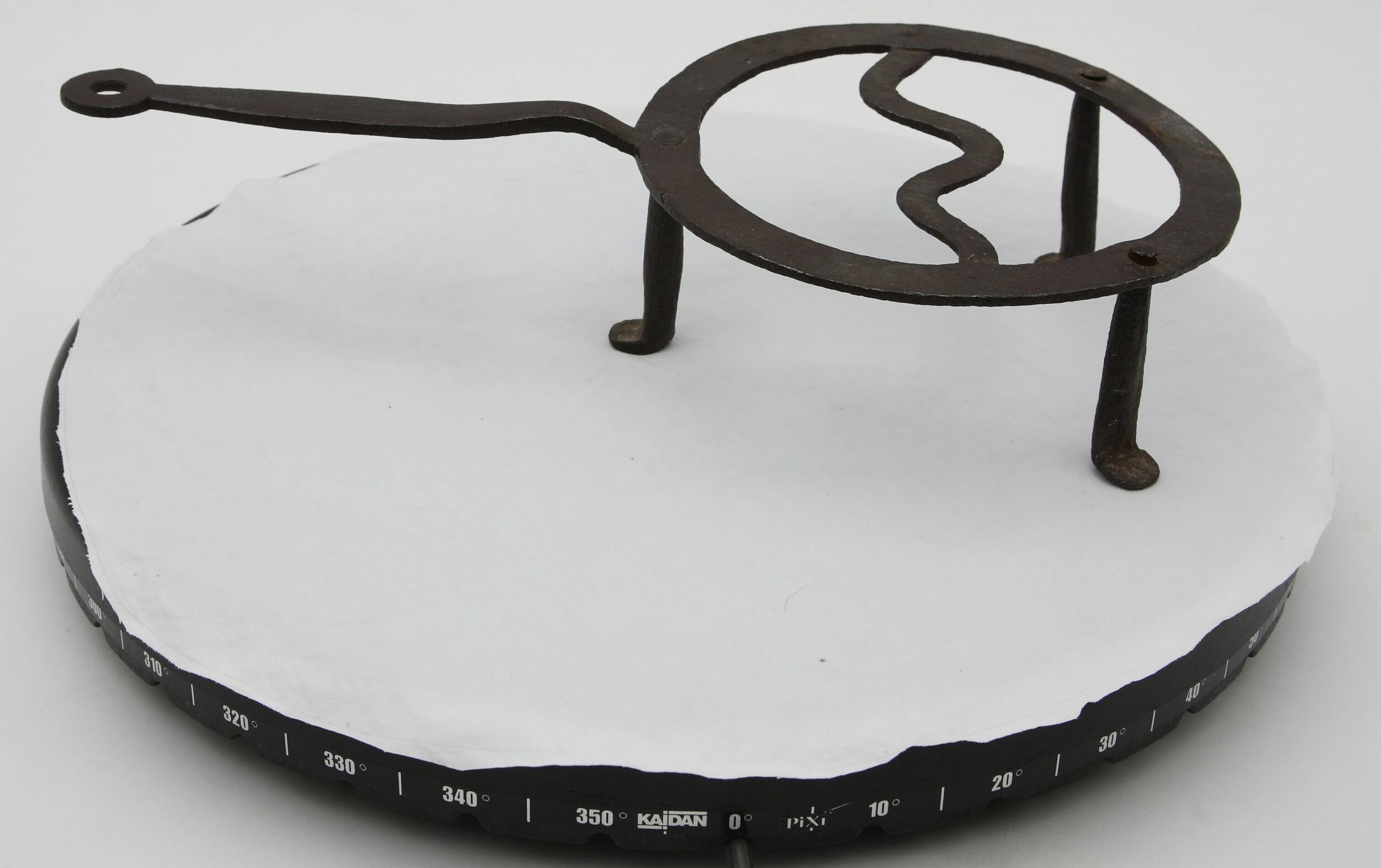
Circle trivet with three legs

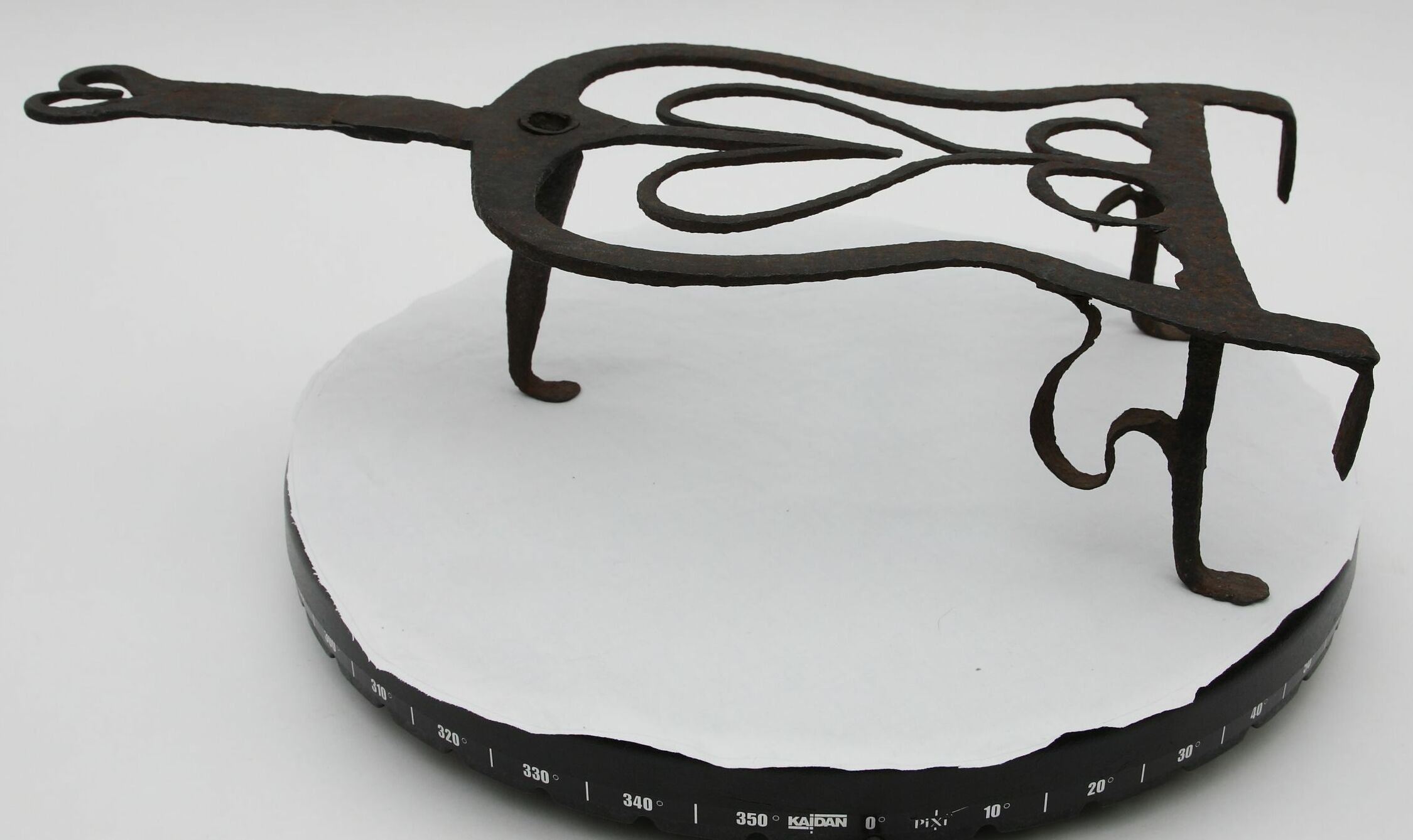
Heart trivet with three legs
