= Zhao Hu =

Zhao Hu may refer to:

- Zhao Hu (趙胡), the name of a Nanyue ruler as recorded in Records of the Grand Historian, probably Zhao Mo (died 122 BC), but could also be a different person
- Zhao Hu (character) (趙虎), a fictional character in the novel The Seven Heroes and Five Gallants
