= Gridiron (cooking) =

Metal grate for grilling over a fire

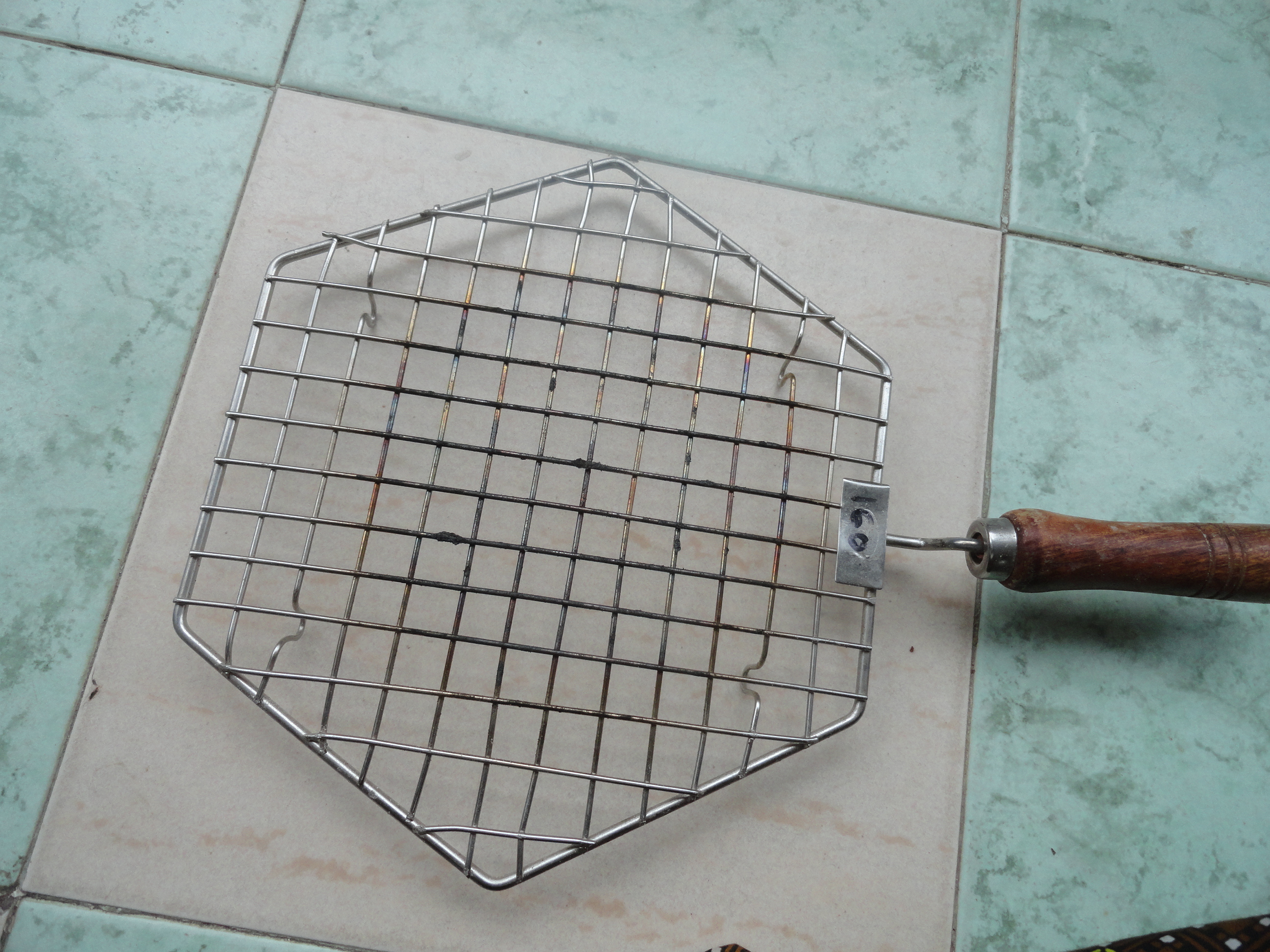
A simple gridiron

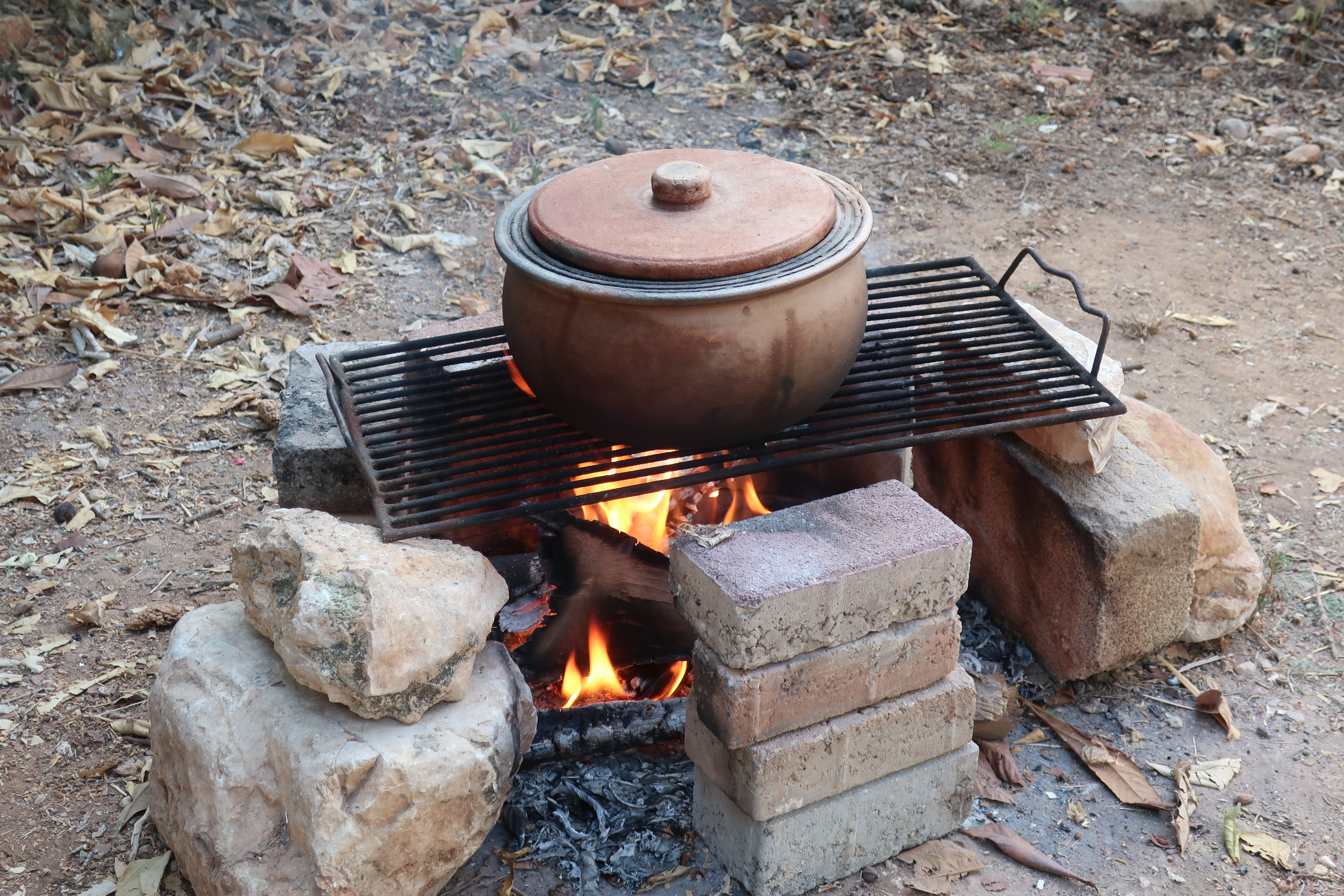
Gridiron supporting an earthenware pot over a makeshift brick stove

A gridiron /ˈɡrɪdˌaɪərn/ is a metal grate with parallel bars typically used for grilling foods. Some designs involve two such grates hinged to fold together, securely holding food while grilling over an open flame.

== Development ==
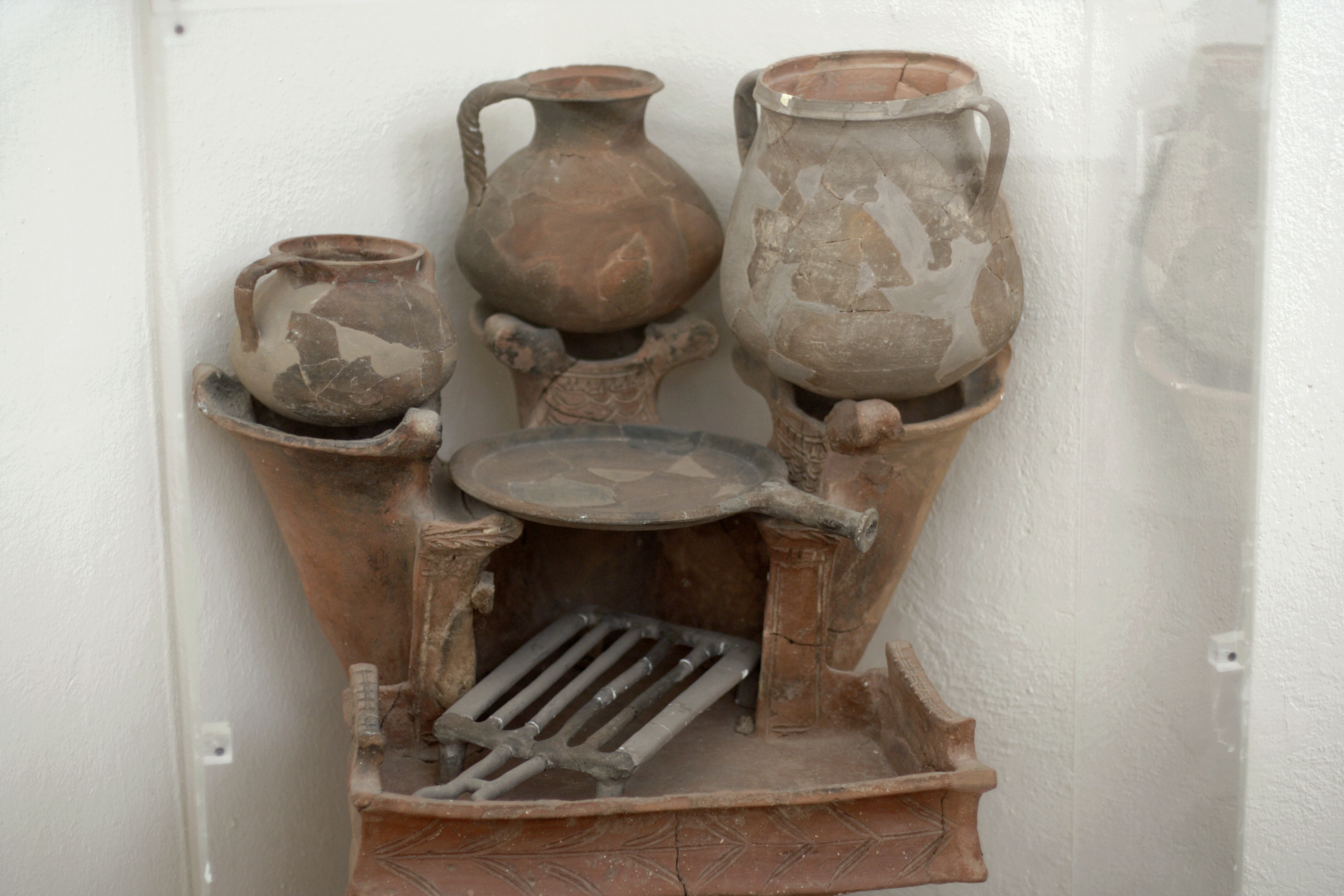
Roman era stove, Delos, Greece

Early examples of the gridiron were found in Pompeii. The Latin term is craticula, a diminutive form of "crates". This referred to their cross-hatched design, which appeared similar to a wicker basket, or crate. This is also used as the base for the word graticule, passing through French.

In Mishnaic Hebrew, used by Jews in the 2nd-century AD, the word for gridiron is eskalah (Hebrew: אסכלה), a word borrowed from Koine Greek: εσχάρα, with a slight corruption in pronunciation. Skewers with meat could be laid over the gridiron, or else meat laid directly over the gridiron.

=== Manufacture in US ===
There were numerous iron gridirons manufactured and patented in the United States in the 1800s. These iron legged devices were used in a fireplace placed over the fire to cook food. Over time, gridirons have been developed specifically to accommodate the type of food being prepared and the cooking method being used. A combination hinged gridiron and spider was developed and patented in 1836 by Amasa and George Sizer of Meriden, Connecticut. A steel wire gridiron was developed and patented as early as 1889 in New Haven, Connecticut, by William C. Perkins, of the New Haven Wire Goods Co., who received a U.S. Patent #408,136 for a hinged gridiron that would hold the meat in place while broiling. A commercial hinged broiler or gridiron was designed for use in the Bridge & Beach, Co., 1898 vertical cast iron stove. This hinged broiler was manufactured by Luigi Pieragostini, also of the New Haven Wire Goods Co., and patented in 1939; U.S. Patent #2,148,879.

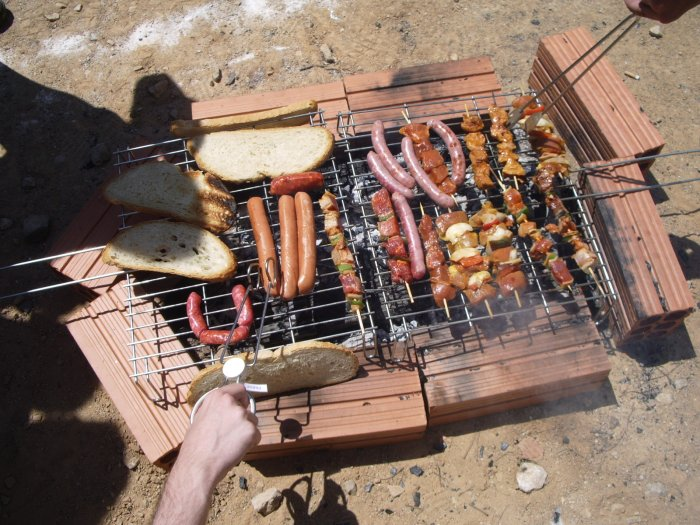
A gridiron in use

Today, hinged gridirons are used extensively to deep fry or broil fast food in restaurants throughout the world. Hot dog gridirons are also available for camping and outdoor cooking.

== Cultural references ==
A gridiron is essential to Chapter 28 of David Copperfield, where David, the Micawbers, and Traddles improvise a meal on one. Charles Dickens mentions gridirons again as a suitable and practical gift that a blacksmith can make in his book Great Expectations, where he refers to their use for cooking sprats.

In response to the block game strategies of some college football teams in 1880 and 1881, in 1882 lines perpendicular to the sidelines and spaced 5-yards apart were placed on the field. Since the field now resembled the cooking utensil the nickname started appearing and was well established by 1895.

In Christian iconography, Saint Lawrence is commonly depicted with a gridiron, as traditional accounts hold that he was martyred by being placed on one over hot coals.

== See also ==
- Brazier
- Trivet

== Bibliography ==
- Elliott, Richard Smith (1883). Notes Taken In Sixty Years. R. P. Studley & Co.
- Riccio, Anthony V. (2006). The Italian Experience In New Haven : Images And Oral Histories. SUNY Press. ISBN 0-7914-6773-2.
- Romaine, Lawrence B. (1990). A Guide To American Trade Catalogs 1744-1900. Courier Dover Publications. ISBN 0-486-26475-0.
