= Nanyue silver box =

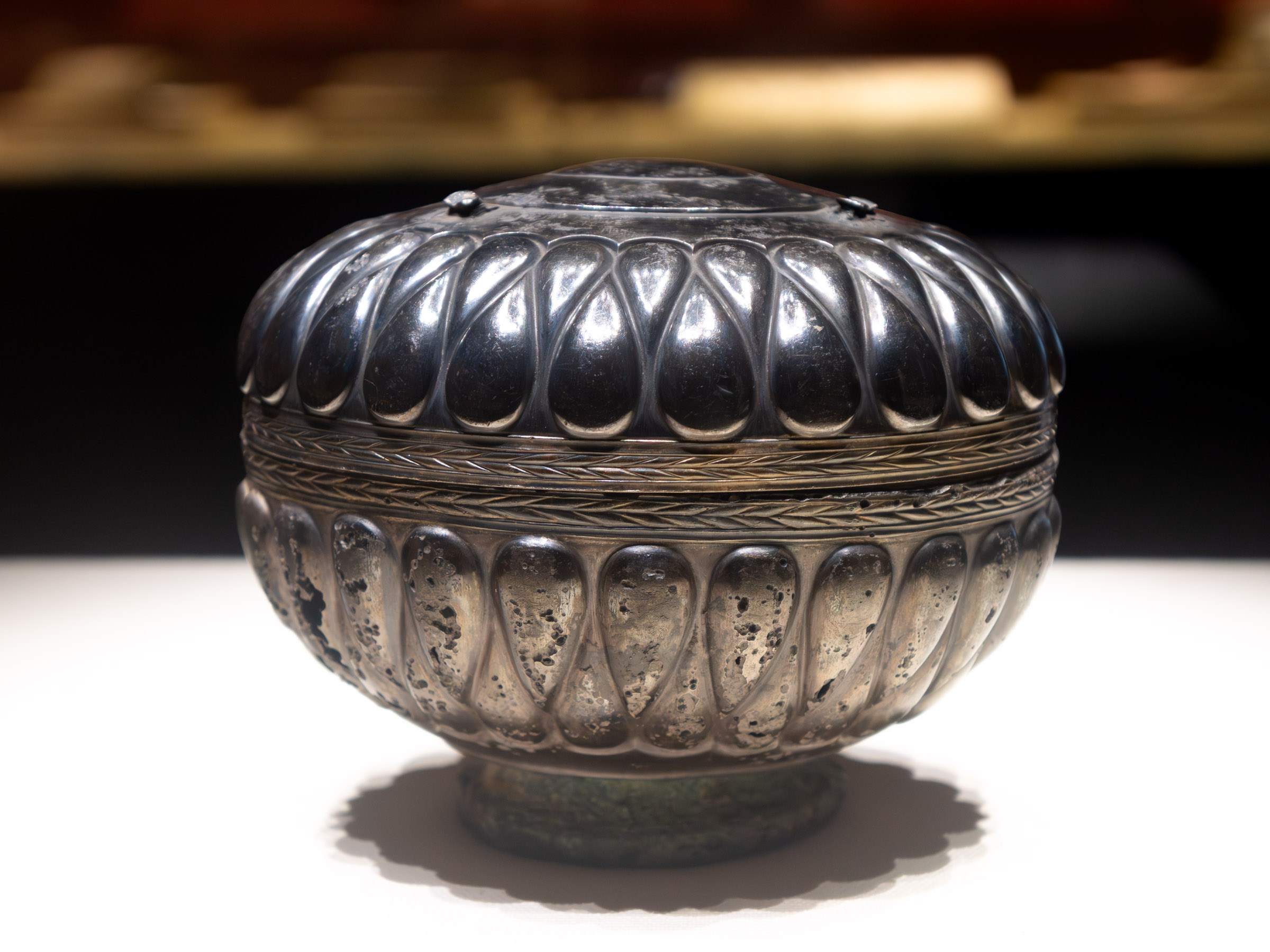
Nanyue silver box

The Nanyue silver box (Ch: 南越裂瓣纹银器) is an ancient silver box with lobed decoration (裂瓣纹) discovered in Southern China in the tomb of Emperor Wen of Nanyue (who died in 124 BCE).

The object is now located in the Museum of the Mausoleum of the Nanyue King. It is thought to reflect the influence of Achaemenid art and Persian art and Persian metalware on Chinese culture. This design especially flourished under the Achaemenid Empire.

Many similar silver boxes have been excavated in Chinese archaeological site. Two similar boxes were excavated in 2004 in a tomb of the Warring States period (475-221 BCE) in Xixin (西辛), Qingzhou.

They were probably manufactured in Central China, rather than in Western Asia or Nanyue as initially thought, as they used Chinese casting technology rather than the cold-hammered technology generally used in Iran. The Nanyue Silver Box is considered as a case of luxurious artifact using a combination of foreign style, imported from West Asia and already influential in 3rd century BCE Han China, with Chinese manufacturing technology.

== Western Asian examples ==
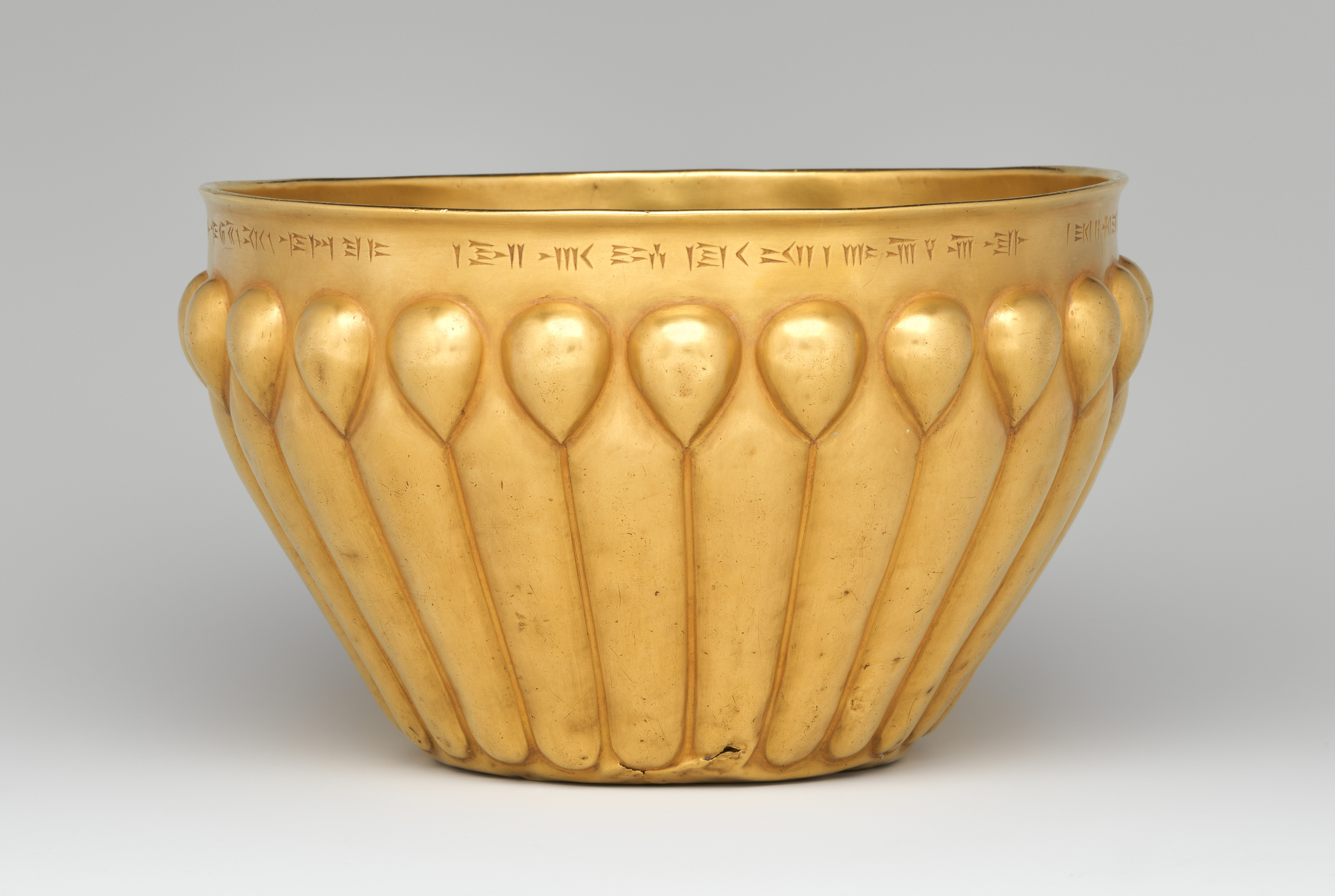
Fluted bowl, Achaemenid, 6th-5th century BCE. Metropolitan Museum.

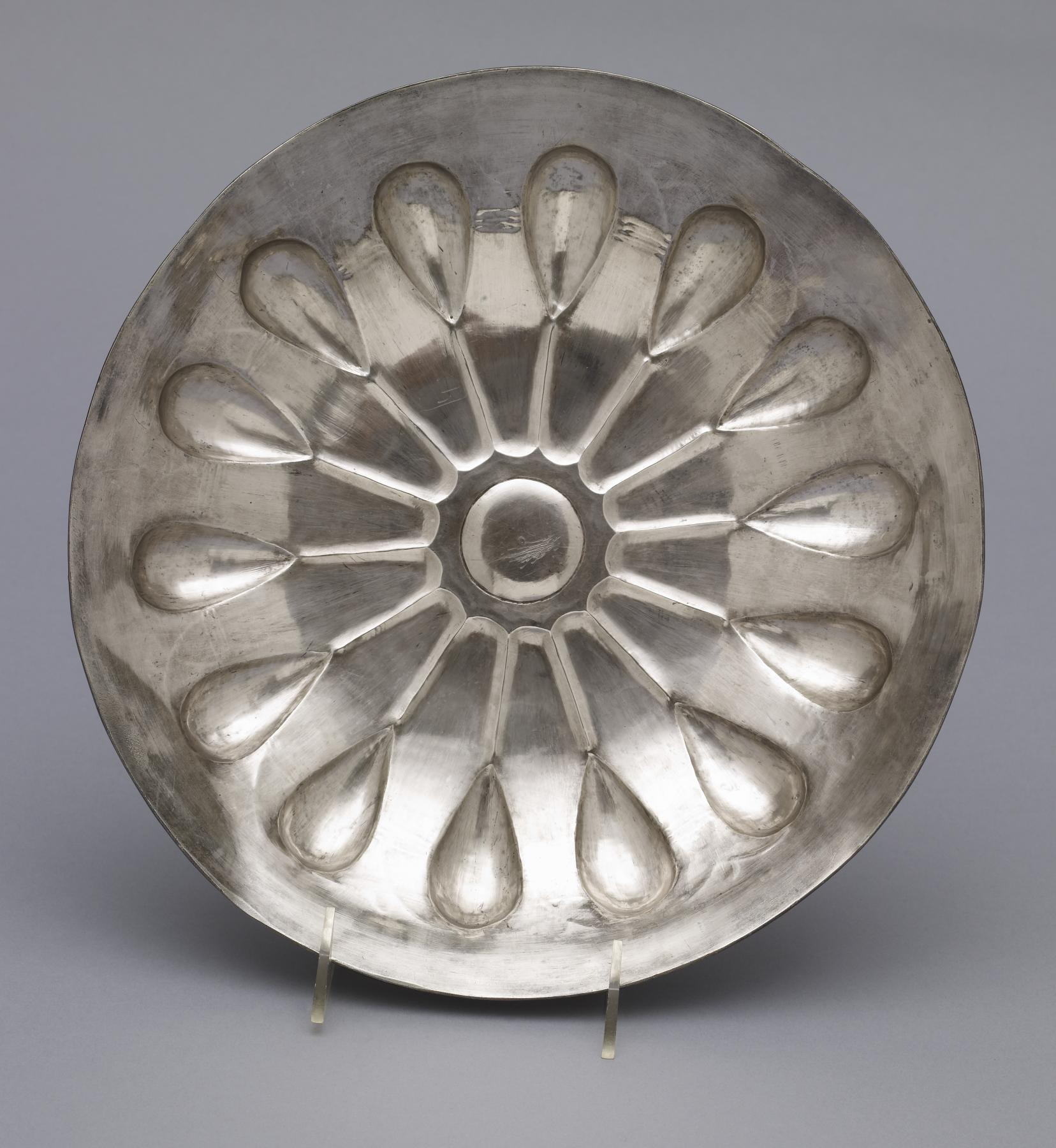
Iranian Shallow Vessel. Walters Museum

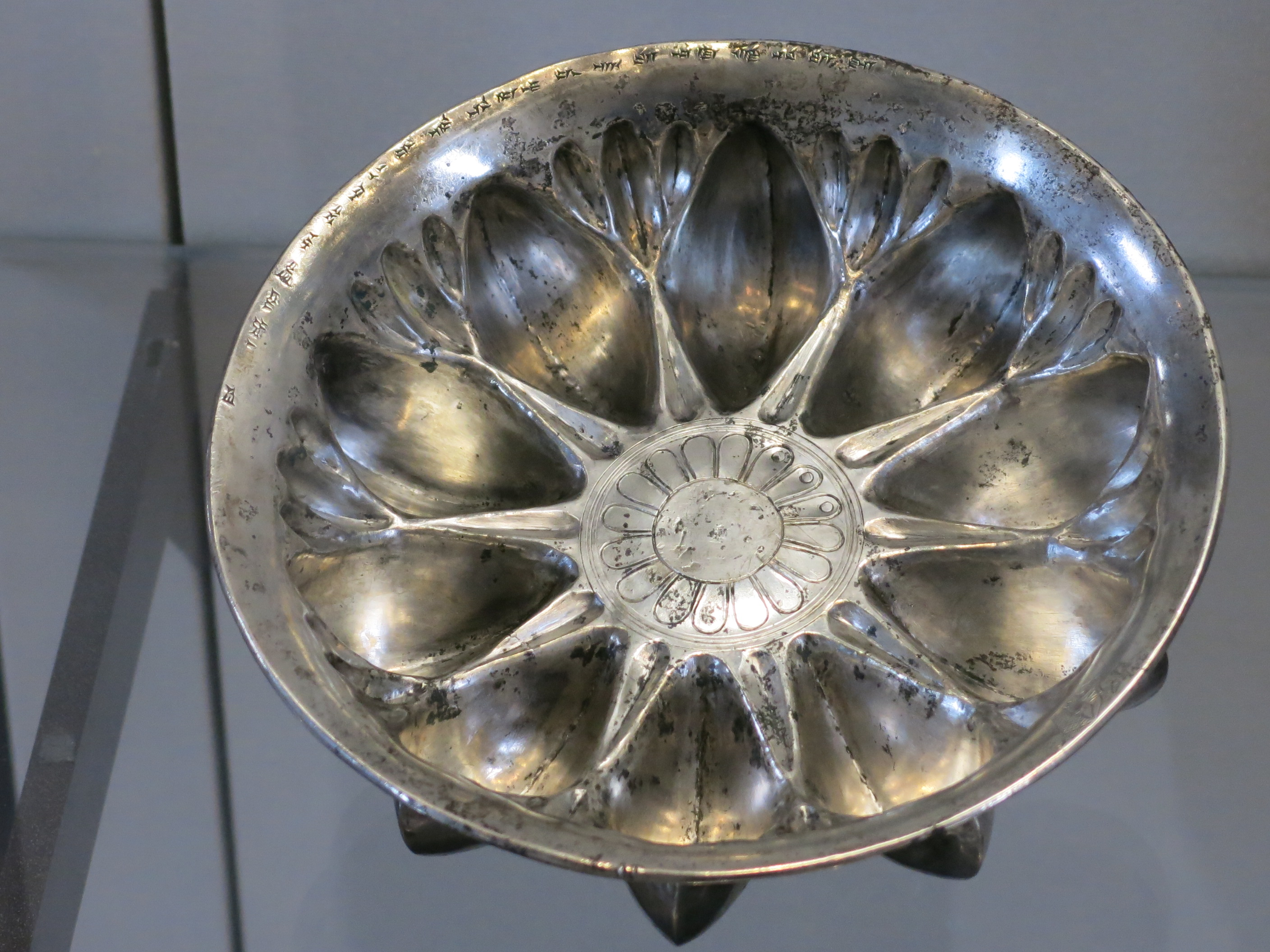
Gadrooned bowl. Silver. West of Iran. 700-500 BCE. Louvre museum
