= Museum of the Mausoleum of the Nanyue King =

Museum in Guangzhou, China

Museum of the Western Han Dynasty Mausoleum of the Nanyue King
- 西漢南越王博物館
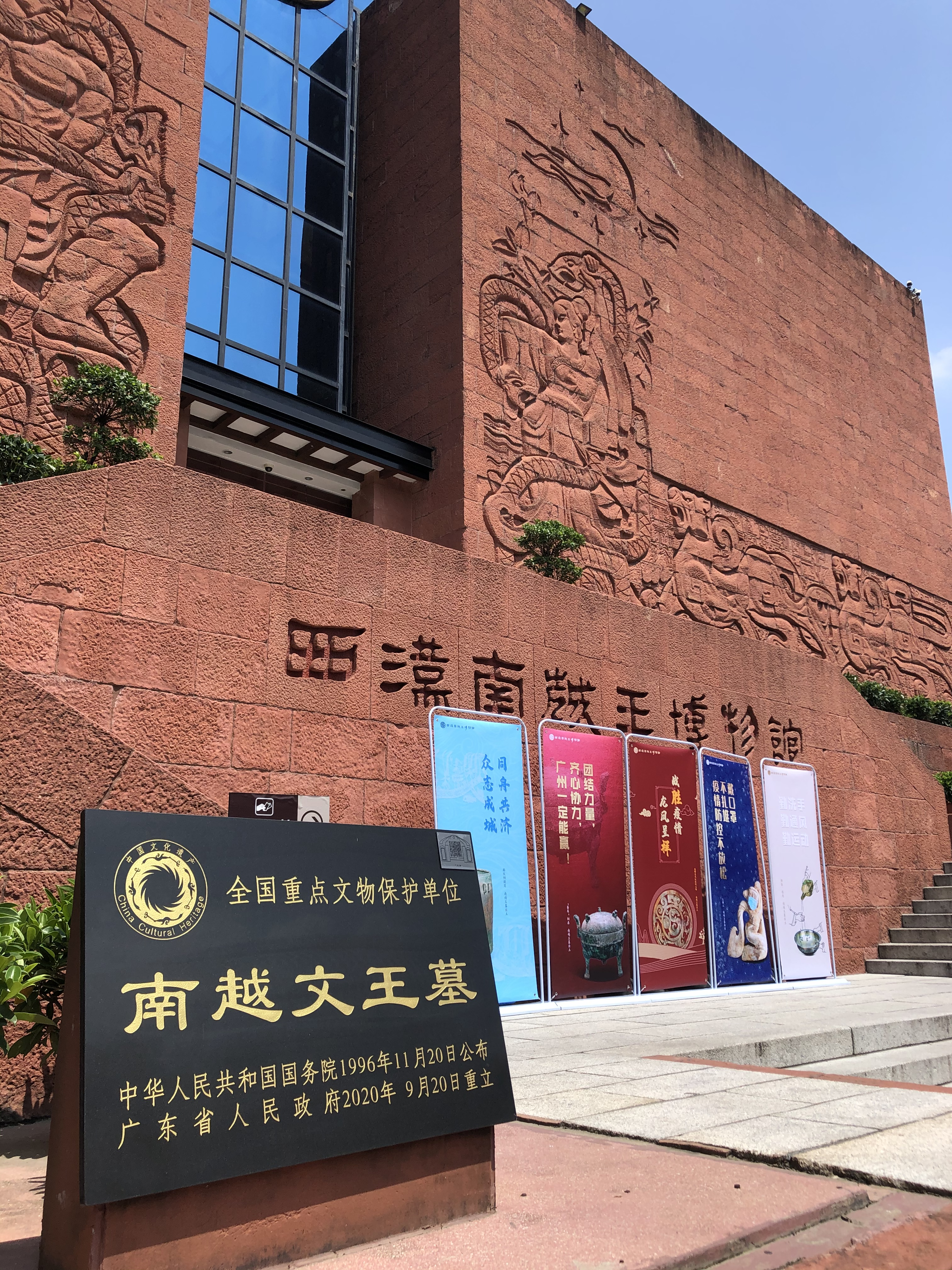
- Established: 1988
- Location: Yuexiu District, Guangzhou, Guangdong
- Coordinates: 23°8′25″N 113°15′20″E
- Type: Mausoleum

Museum of the Mausoleum of the Nanyue King

Chinese name
- Traditional Chinese: 西漢南越王博物館
- Simplified Chinese: 西汉南越王博物馆
- Literal meaning: Western Han Nanyue King Museum
Transcriptions
Standard Mandarin
- Hanyu Pinyin: Xī Hàn Nányuè Wáng Bówùguǎn
Yue: Cantonese
- Jyutping: sai1 hon3 naam4 jyut6 wong4 bok3 mat6 gun2

Vietnamese name
- Vietnamese: Tây Hán Nam Việt Vương Bác Vật Quán

The Museum of the Western Han Dynasty Mausoleum of the Nanyue King, now part of the Nanyue King Museum, houses the 2,000-year-old tomb of the Nanyue King Zhao Mo in Guangzhou.

Zhao Mo ruled from 137 BC to 122 BC, and his tomb was discovered in downtown Guangzhou in 1983. The museum, which opened in 1988, showcases the tomb and its complete trove of artifacts. It was named a Major National Historical Site in 1996 and is renowned for its rare assemblage of funerary artifacts representing the diffusion of cultures throughout the Lingnan region during the Han dynasty.

== Layout ==
The mausoleum and museum complex occupies an area of 17,400 m^{2} (187,000 sq ft). Hidden 20 meters (65.6 feet) underground, the tomb is made up of 750 huge stones with colorful murals. The over 1,000 pieces of cultural relics, bronzeware and terra cotta ware in particular, feature the Yue Culture of Lingnan (Nanyue Culture). Represented also are traces of central Chinese culture, the Chu culture of south China, the Bashu culture of southwest China, the culture from the northern grassland, and even foreign cultures.

The mausoleum was discovered in 1983 and excavated by archaeologists Mai Yinghao and Huang Zhanyue. The museum opened in 1988. It is 20 meters under Xianggang Shan (Elephant Hill, Jyutping: zoeng6 gong1 saan1) in Guangzhou on a construction site for a hotel, and was excavated. The tomb is nearly 11 meters long and over 12 meters wide. It is divided in seven parts, with a front chamber, east and west wing rooms, the main coffin chamber, east and west side rooms, and a back storage chamber.

== Artifacts ==
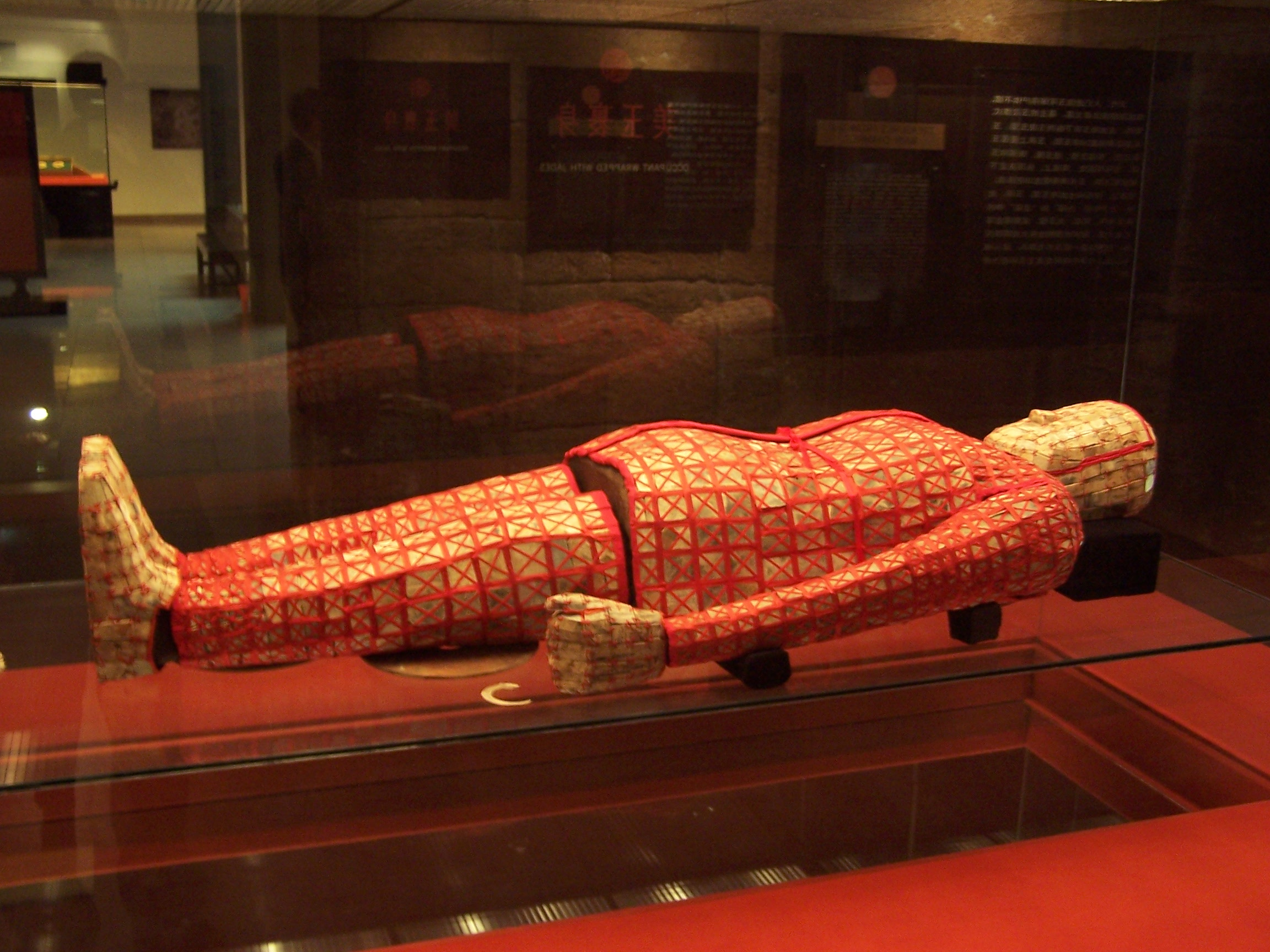
Jade burial suit of King Zhao Mo

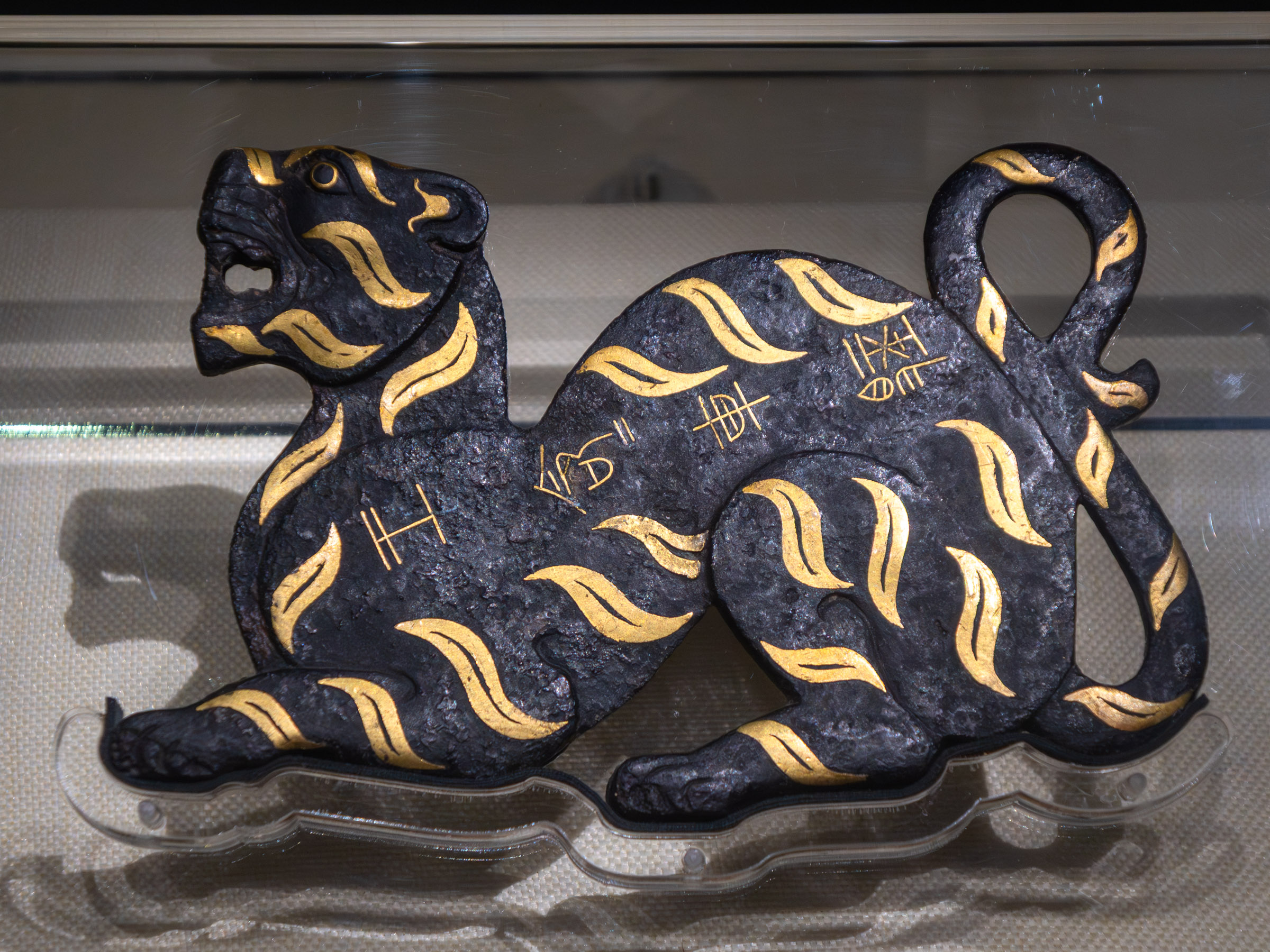
Bronze tiger inlaid with gold, inscribed 王命車徒 "The king orders the carriage to move"

The tomb has yielded more than 1,000 burial artifacts; a chariot, more than 50 cooking implements, among which gold, silver and bronze vessels, trivets, 10 metal swords, musical instruments, such as a set of eight bronze bells, chime bells, stone chimes and a zither with its components, an armored breastplate containing 709 metal plates, shields and spears, and human sacrifices were found (15 courtiers were buried alive with him to serve him in death). It is also among the only tombs of the early Western Han period that has murals on its walls.

The tomb also excavated a unique imperial seal, belonging to that of "Emperor Wen" (Văn Đế), indicating that he styled himself emperor domestically as opposed to a king externally. The large scale of jade pendants worn by the deceased and his wives also amounts to imperial rank.

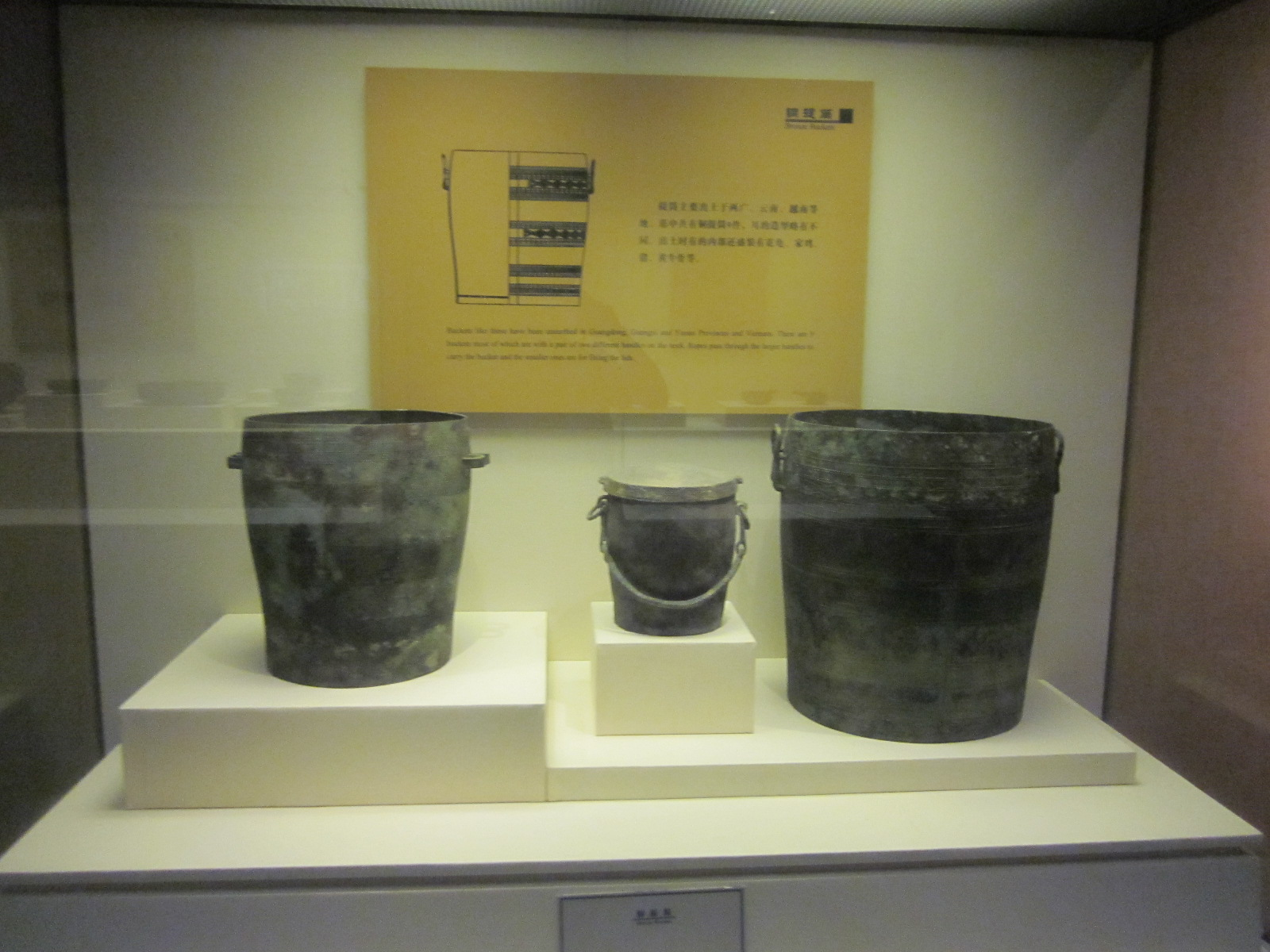
Đông Sơn bronze jars from the mausoleum

Alongside Chinese artifacts, pieces from the steppes, and Iranian and Hellenistic Central Asian regions have been found: a Persian silver box found in the tomb is the earliest imported product found to date in China. There were artifacts that were found in which belonged to the Đông Sơn culture of northern Vietnam.

A silk-jade garment made up of 2,291 pieces of jade is the spotlight of the mausoleum. It is acknowledged that jade garments with pieces connected by gold, silver, or copper are not uncommon. But this garment is unique for its jade pieces connected by silk which makes it the only one of its kind in the world. Nor are historical records available to verify other jade garments connected by silk thread. In addition, the style of buttons down the front is unique among unearthed jade garments. This silk-sewn-jade garment shows the early development of jade garments as well as development of the Nanyue culture.

== Access ==
The museum is located at 867 Jiefang Rd. in Yuexiu District in central Guangzhou. It is accessible by bus routes 7, 29, 33, 203, 211, 273, 543, and 552, and by Metro Line 2 to the Yuexiu Park (Exit E).

== See also ==
- Nanyue King Museum
- List of museums in China
- Nanyue
- Triệu dynasty
- Zhao Mo
- Southward expansion of the Han dynasty
- Nanyue silver box
