= Jade burial suit =

Ceremonial suit made of jade

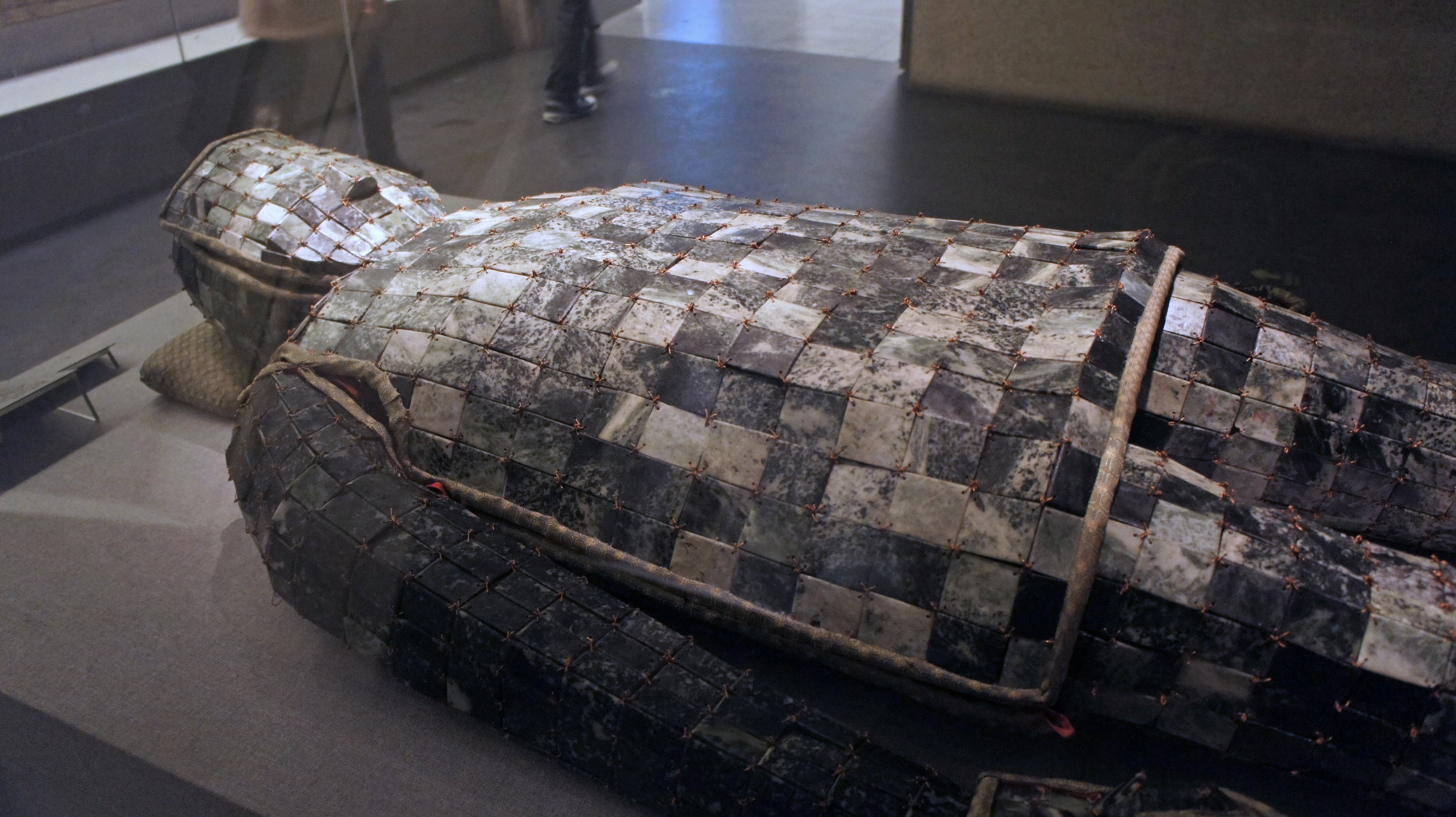
Jade burial suit of Liu Sui, Prince of Liang, of Western Han, made with 2,008 pieces of jade

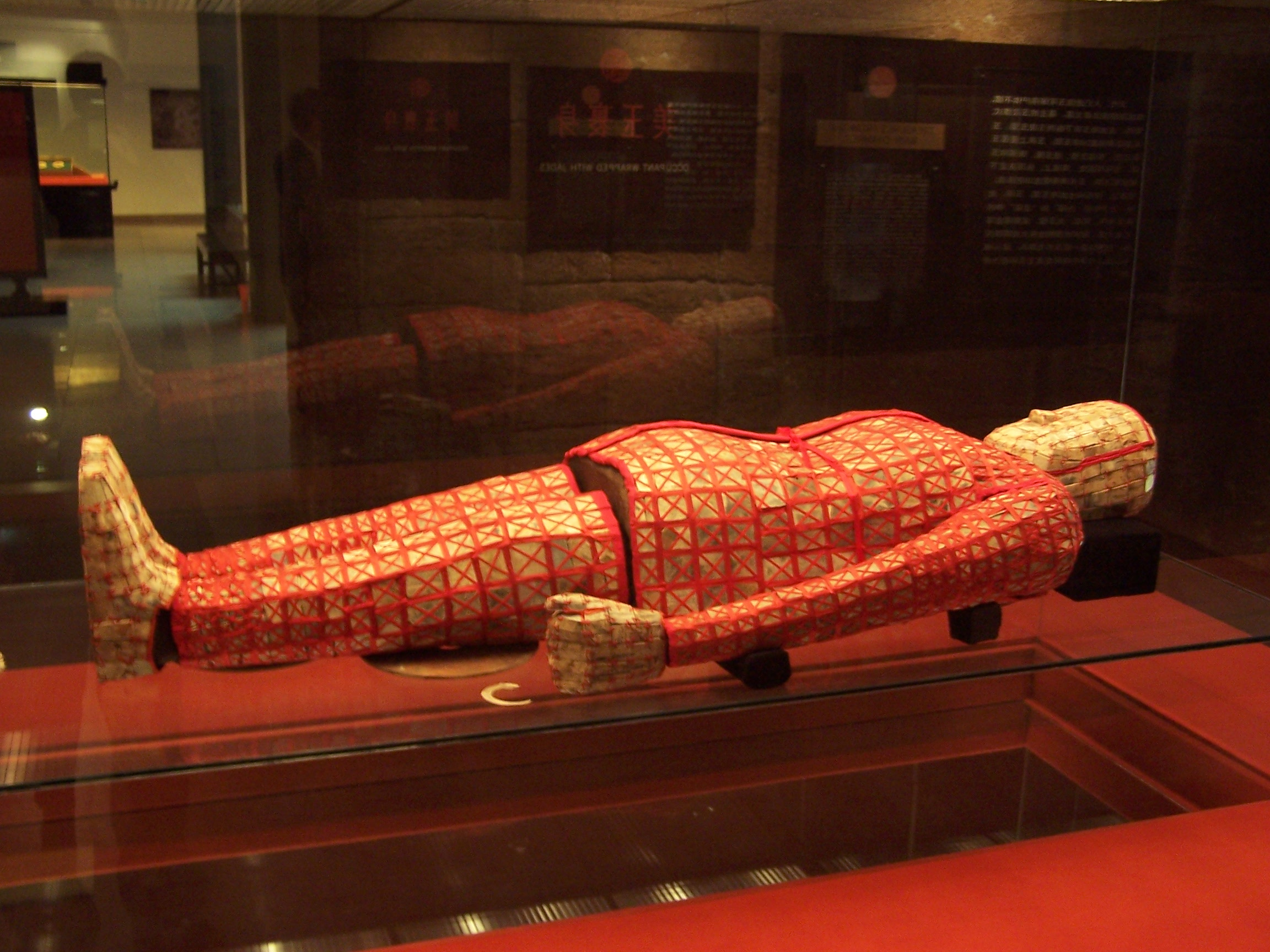
Jade burial suit in the Nanyue King Museum in Guangzhou

A jade burial suit (Chinese: 玉衣; pinyin: yù yī; lit. 'jade clothing') is a ceremonial suit made of pieces of jade in which royal members of China's Han dynasty were buried.

== Construction ==
Of the jade suits that have been found, the pieces of jade are mostly square or rectangular in shape, though triangular, trapezoid and rhomboid plaques have also been found. Plaques are often joined by means of wire, threaded through small holes drilled near the corners of each piece. The composition of the wire varies, and several suits have been found joined with either gold or silver. Other suits, such as that of King Zhao Mo, were joined using silk thread, or silk ribbon that overlapped the edges of the plaques. In some instances, additional pieces of jade have been found beneath the head covering, including shaped plaques to cover the eyes, and plugs to fit the ears and nose.

According to the Book of Later Han, the type of wire used was dependent on the status of the person buried. The jade burial suits of emperors used gold thread; princes, princesses, dukes, and marquises, silver thread; sons or daughters of those given silver thread, copper thread; and lesser aristocrats, silk thread, with all others being forbidden to be buried in jade burial suits. Examination of the known suits, such as the two found in Mancheng, has revealed that these rules were not always followed. Considering the vast size of the country, and the relatively slow means of disseminating information, it is not surprising that the materials and techniques used in a jade burial suit occasionally differed from the official guidelines.

A jade burial suit was extremely expensive to create, and only wealthy aristocrats could afford to be buried in them. Additionally, the process of manufacturing a suit was labor-intensive and is estimated to have required several years to complete a single suit.

Despite their beauty and cultural significance, Jade Burial Suits were not without their practical challenges. Because they were made entirely of jade, they were heavy and difficult to move, and required a great deal of strength and manpower to transport. In addition, the suits were often too small to fit the actual body of the deceased, and were instead placed on a wooden effigy or mannequin that was placed in the tomb alongside the jade burial suit.

== History ==
=== Cultural history ===
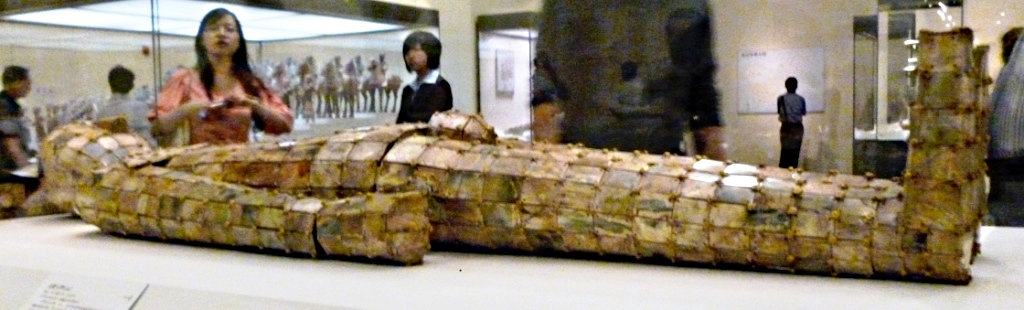
Jade shroud for King of Zhongshan, Liu Xiu (d. 57 BCE), in the National Museum of China, Beijing, China.

For many years, many archaeologists were unaware of the existence of jade burial suits. Texts referenced jade boxes or coverings related to a corpse, but it was not understood that the texts were describing full-body, fitted suits or shrouds, made of jade plaques. The discovery in 1968 of two complete jade suits in the tombs of Liu Sheng and Dou Wan in Mancheng, Hebei, finally proved their existence.

It is now believed that jade burial suits were actually relatively common among the wealthiest aristocrats of the Han dynasty, but that over the years most have been lost due to the activities of grave robbers. Emperor Wen of Wei banned the production of jade suits in 223 CE to reduce tomb looting.

=== Site history ===
Tombs from the Spring and Autumn period, belonging to the dukes of the Jin state in Quwo, were discovered in which the body was covered with small jade pieces once interwoven with silk. The jade suits of Liu Sheng and Dou Wan consisted of 2,498 plates of solid jade connected with two and a half pounds of gold wires.

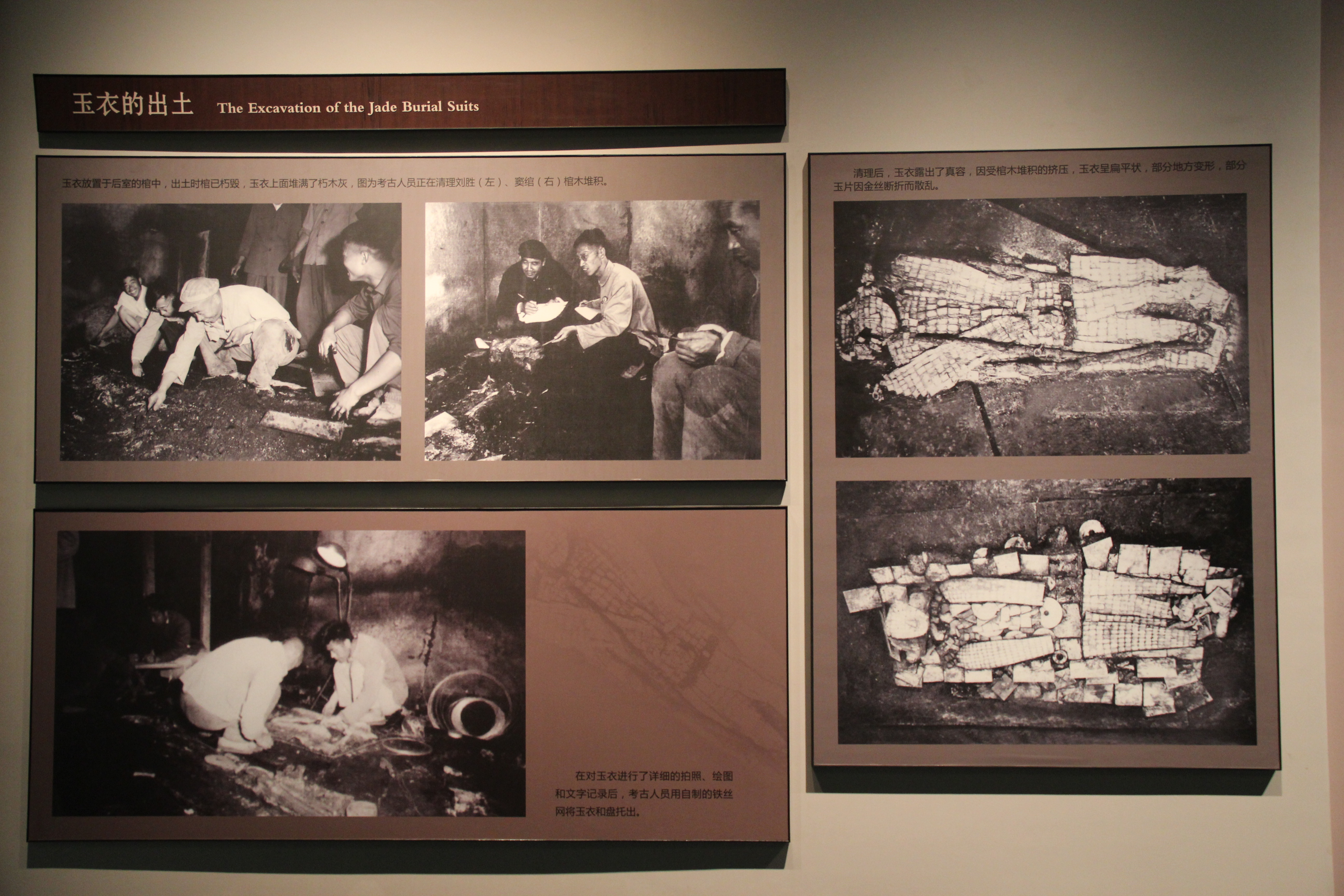
Excavation of the Jade Burial Suits taken from the Hebei Museum in Shijiazhuang, Hebei, China.

Since the first jade burial suits discovery, there have been multiple additional findings. In 1973, a jade burial suit belonging to Prince Huai of the Western Han dynasty was discovered in Dingxian, Hebei. It consisted of 1,203 pieces of jade and 2,580 grams of gold thread. In 1983, a jade suit was found in the tomb of Zhao Mo, the second king of Southern Yue, in Guangzhou. The red silk thread used to bind the 2,291 jade plates represented Zhao Mo's immersion into local culture. It is exhibited in the local Nanyue King Museum. In 1991, a jade burial suit was excavated from a group of monumental tombs of the King of Chu, Liu Wu, in Xuzhou. This magnificent, life-sized jade and gold burial suit survived very much intact, thereby possessing a high value for artistic appreciation.

== Gallery ==
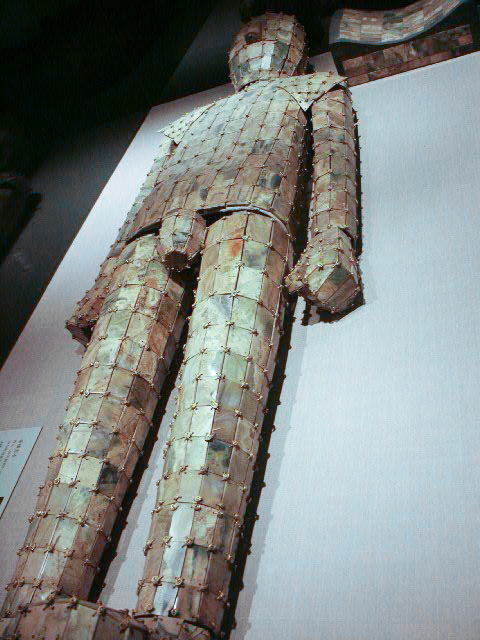
A Han dynasty jade burial suit at the National Museum of China, Beijing

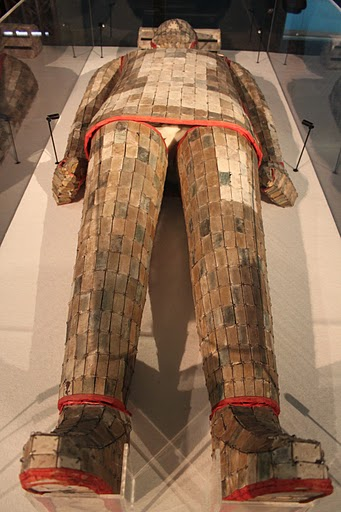
Jade burial suit at the Henan Museum, in Zhengzhou

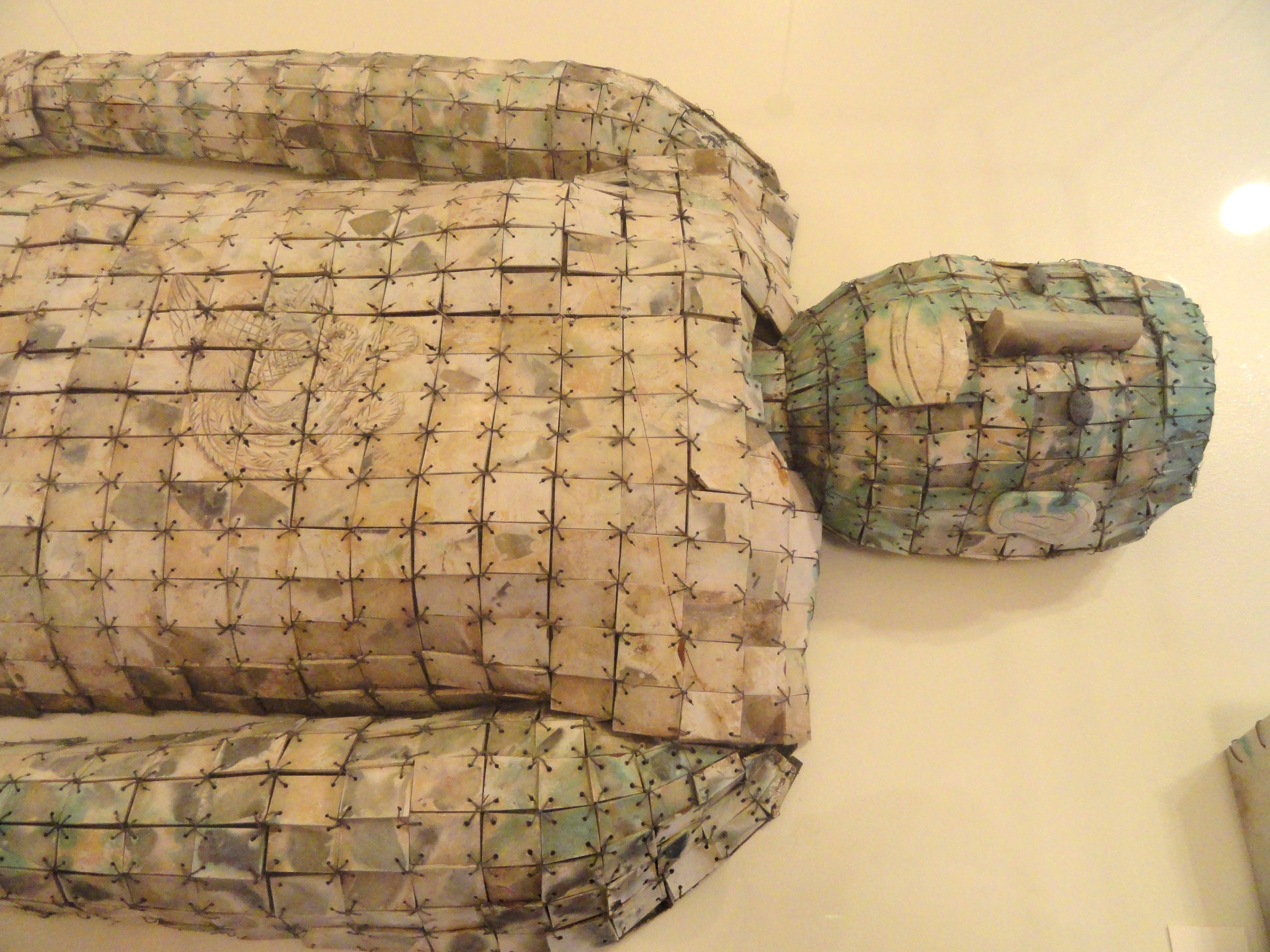
Detail of a jade burial suit with replaced copper wire in the George Walter Vincent Smith Art Museum in Springfield, Massachusetts

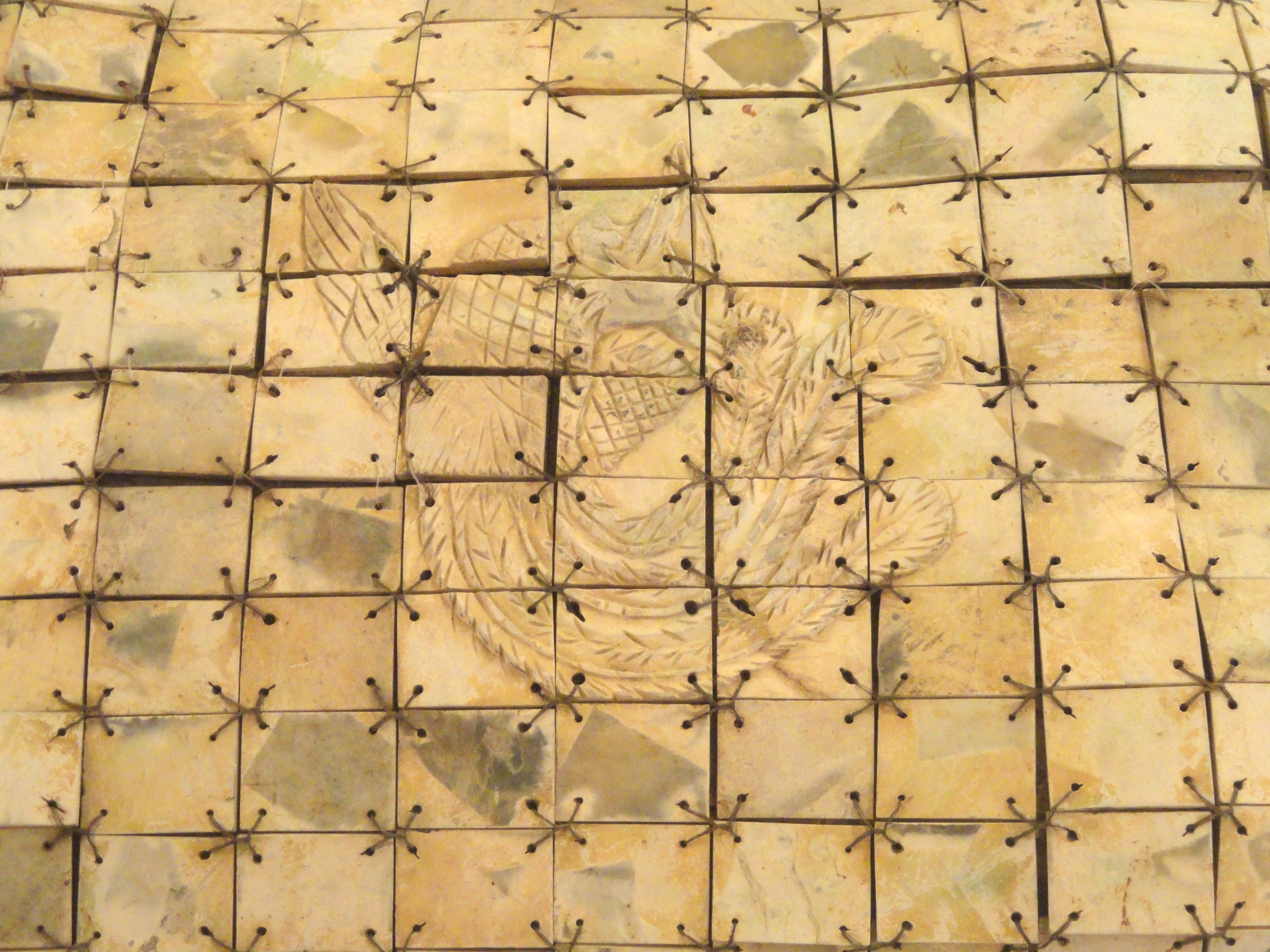
Close up detail of a jade burial suit with replaced copper wire in the George Walter Vincent Smith Art Museum

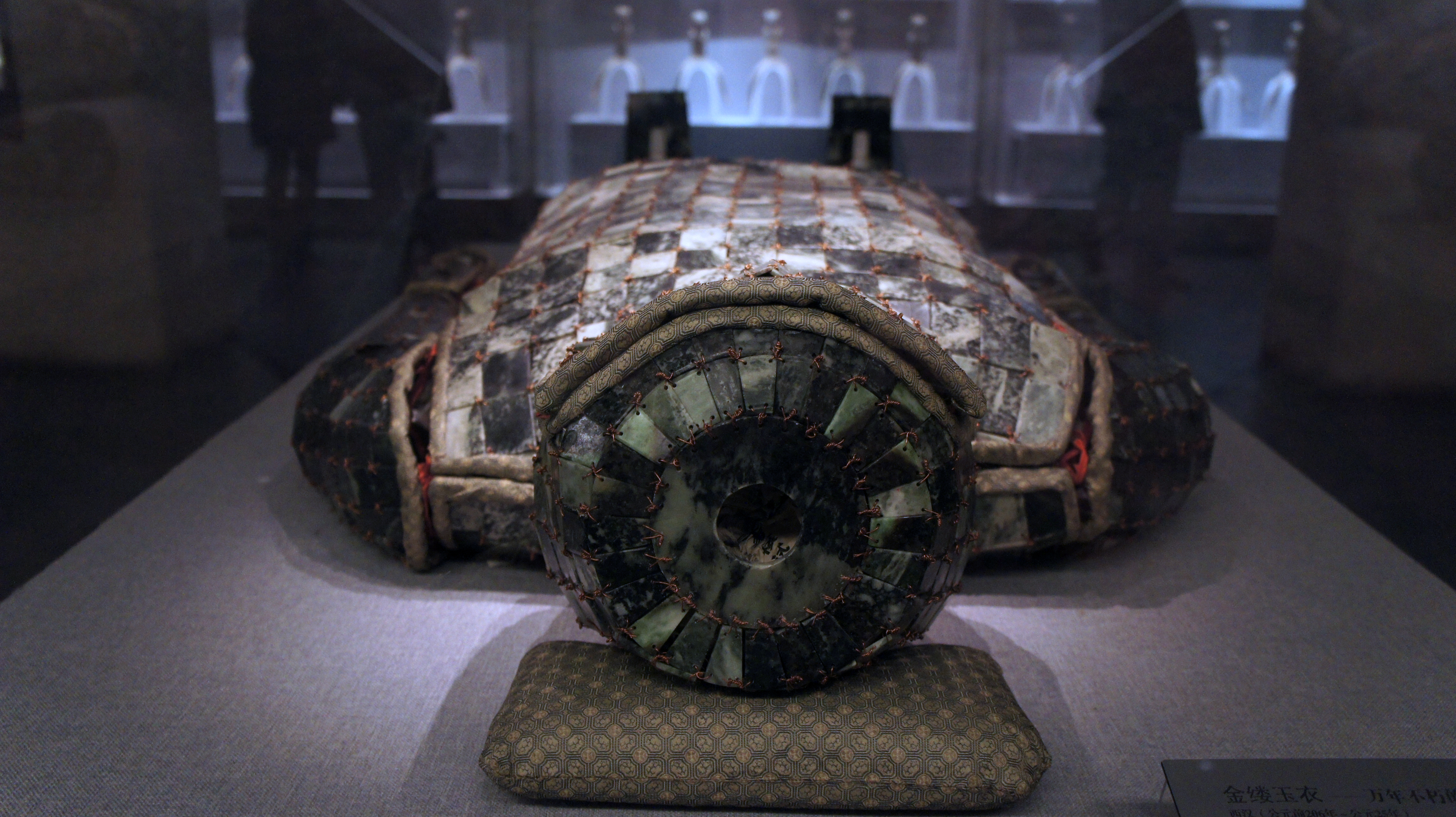
Detail of the head section of the jade burial suit of Liu Sui, Prince of Liang, of Western Han

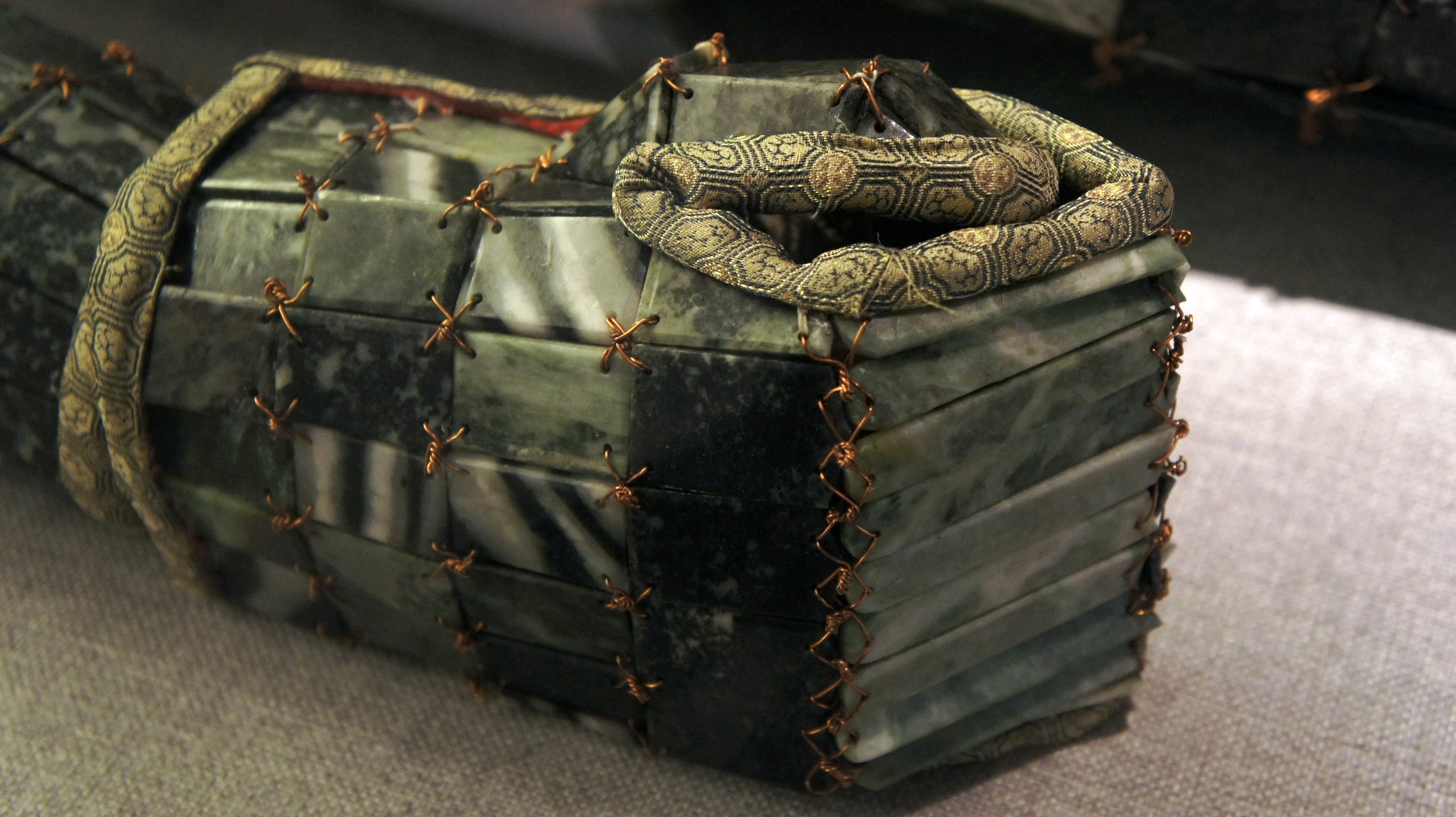
Detail of the hand section of the jade burial suit of Liu Sui, Prince of Liang, of Western Han

== See also ==
- Chinese jade
