= Zhao Mo =

Emperor Wen of Nanyue Triệu Văn Đế 南越文帝
- Emperor of Nanyue
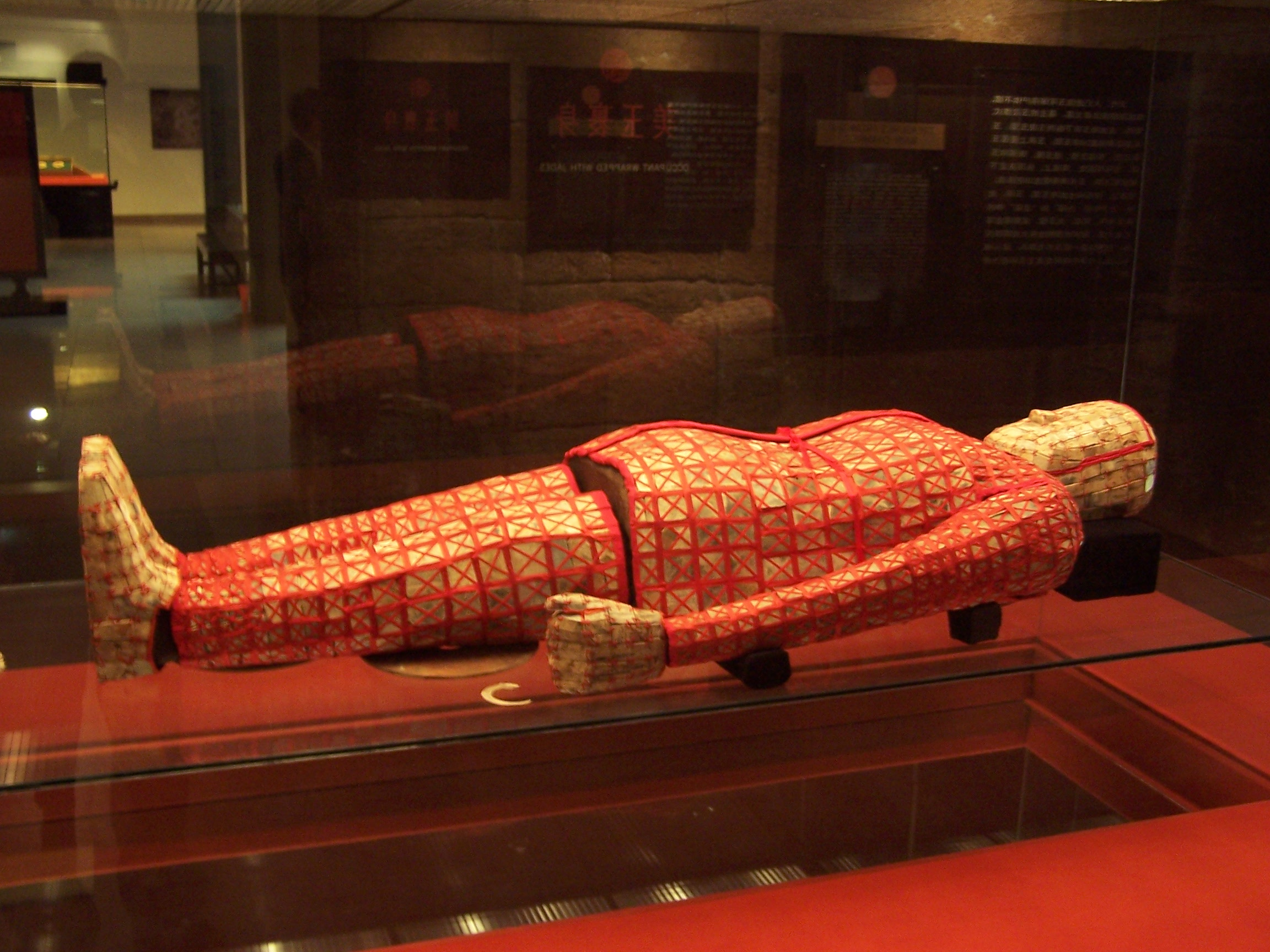
- Zhao Mo's jade burial suit with red silk displayed in Nanyue King Museum in Guangzhou

Emperor of Nanyue
- Reign: 137–124 BC
- Predecessor: Zhao Tuo (Triệu Vũ Đế)
- Successor: Zhao Yingqi (Triệu Minh Vương)
- Born: 175 BC; Nanyue
- Died: 124 BC (aged 51); Nanyue
Names
- Chinese: 趙眜; pinyin: Zhào Mò; Vietnamese: Triệu Mạt
Posthumous name
- Chinese: 趙文帝; pinyin: Zhào Wén Dì; Vietnamese: Triệu Văn Đế
- House: Triệu dynasty
- Dynasty: Nanyue
- Father: Zhao Zhongshi (Triệu Trọng Thủy)

Zhao Mo (175-124 BC, Chinese: 趙眜; pinyin: Zhào Mò) also known as Emperor Wen and as Triệu Mạt or Triệu Văn Đế in Vietnamese was the second ruler of Nanyue. He succeeded his grandfather Zhao Tuo (Emperor Wu) in 137 BC and reigned until his death in 124 BC.

== Name ==
Records from this period were written in classical Chinese and are transliterated, typically into either pinyin (romanized Chinese) or into alphabetical Vietnamese. The name 趙眜 is transliterated as Zhào Mò in pinyin, but as Triệu Mạt in Vietnamese. Zhao/Triệu is a family name, so Zhao Mo's dynasty is referred to as the Triệu dynasty in Vietnam. His temple name described him as the "literary emperor" (Chinese: 趙文帝; pinyin: Zhào Wén Dì; Vietnamese: Triệu Văn Đế).

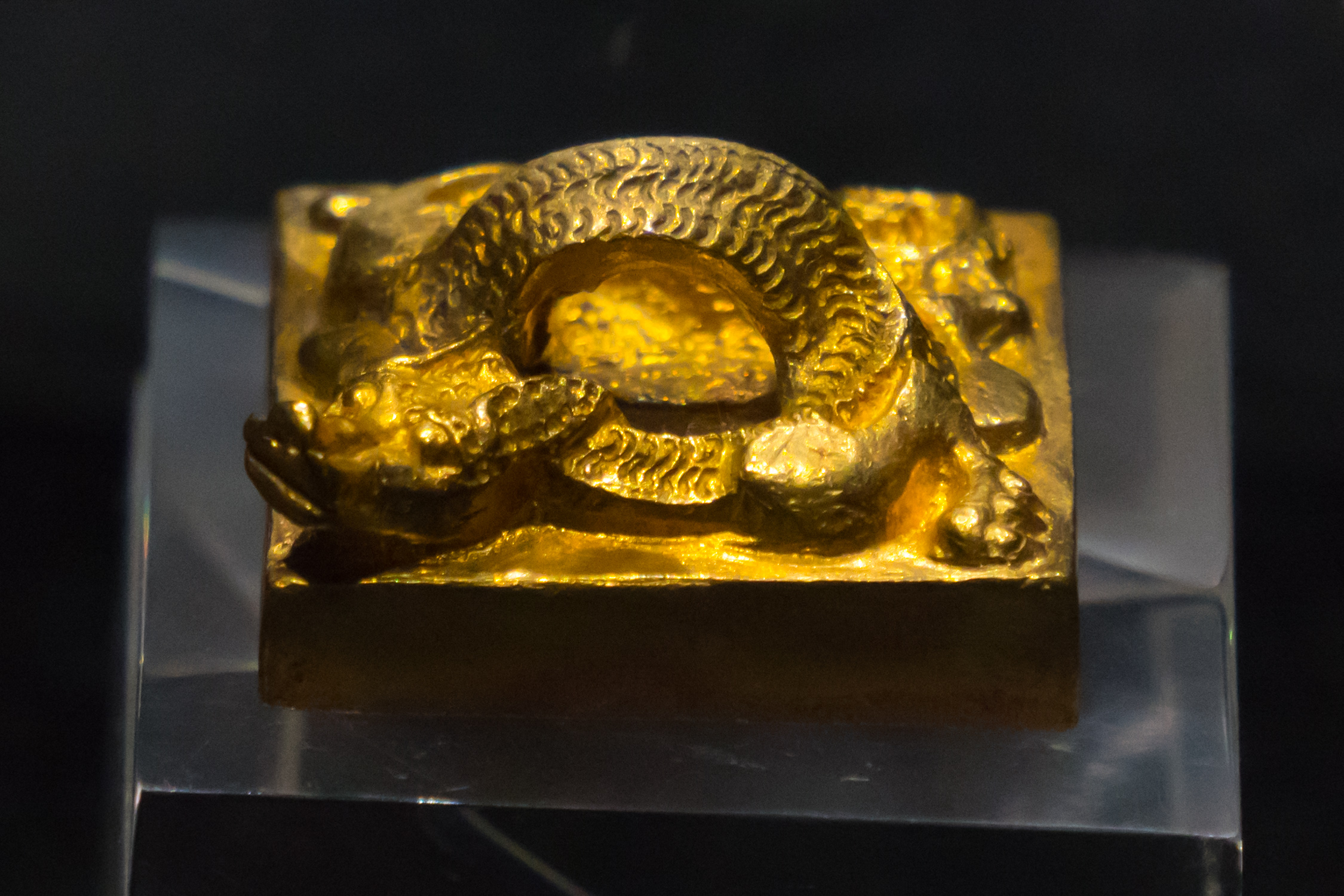
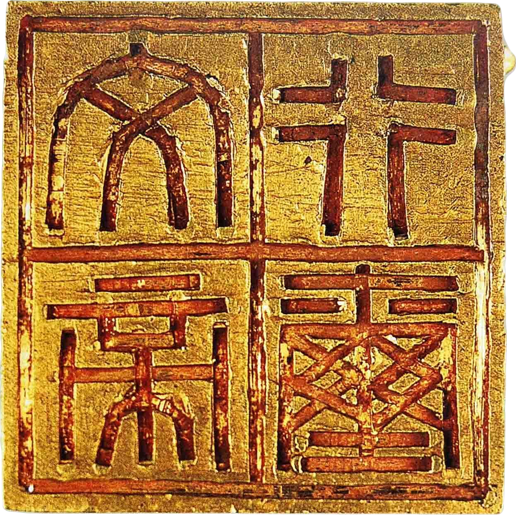
Seal of Zhao Mo. The inscription says: Chinese: 文 帝 行 璽; pinyin: Wén Dì xíng xǐ; lit. 'Seal of Emperor Wén [Văn]'.

Zhao's name was recorded as Zhao Hu (Chinese: 趙胡; pinyin: Zhào Hú) in the Records of the Grand Historian by Sima Qian. The name of Zhao Mo did not arise until the discovery of two jade seals belonging to the emperor that bore the name of Zhao Mo but not Zhao Hu. "Zhao Hu" may have been an error made by Sima Qian when he was writing his Records. There is also a theory that Zhao Mo and Zhao Hu were two separate rulers and that Zhao Mo's reign was excluded from historical records because of its brief duration.

== Life ==
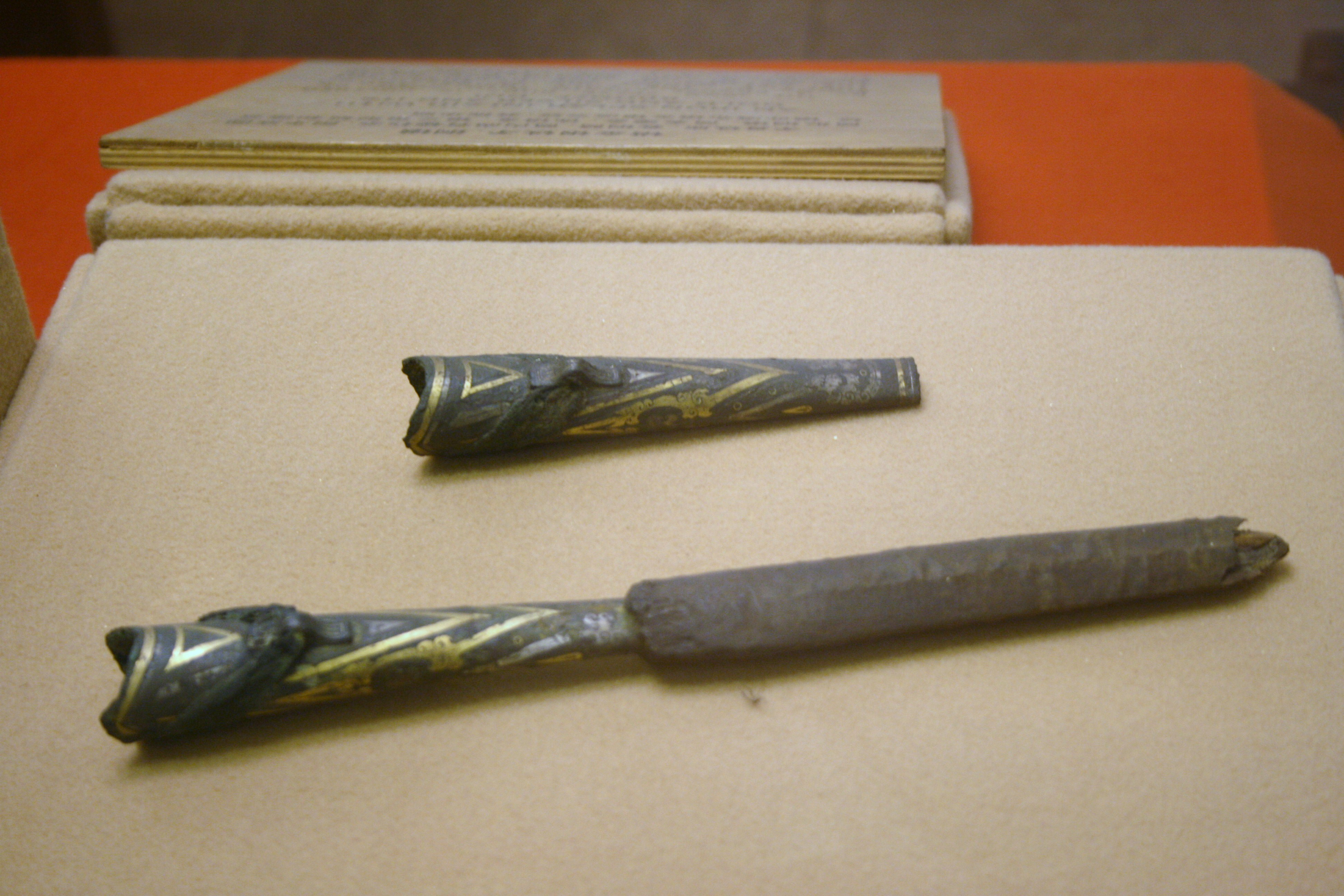
Inlaid iron spear with sheath, from the tomb of Zhao Mo

Upon Zhao Mo's accession in 137 BC, the neighboring king of Minyue, Zou Ying sent his army to attack Nanyue. Zhao sent for help from the Han dynasty, his nominal vassal overlord. The Han responded by sending troops against Minyue, but before they could get there, Zou Ying was killed by his brother Zou Yushan, who surrendered to the Han. The Han army was recalled.

Zhao considered visiting the Han court in order to show his gratitude. His high ministers argued against it, reminding him that his father kept his distance from the Han and merely avoided a breach of etiquette to keep the peace. Zhao therefore pleaded illness and never went through with the trip. Zhao did actually fall ill several years later and died in 124 BC. He was succeeded by his son, Zhao Yingqi.

== Tomb ==
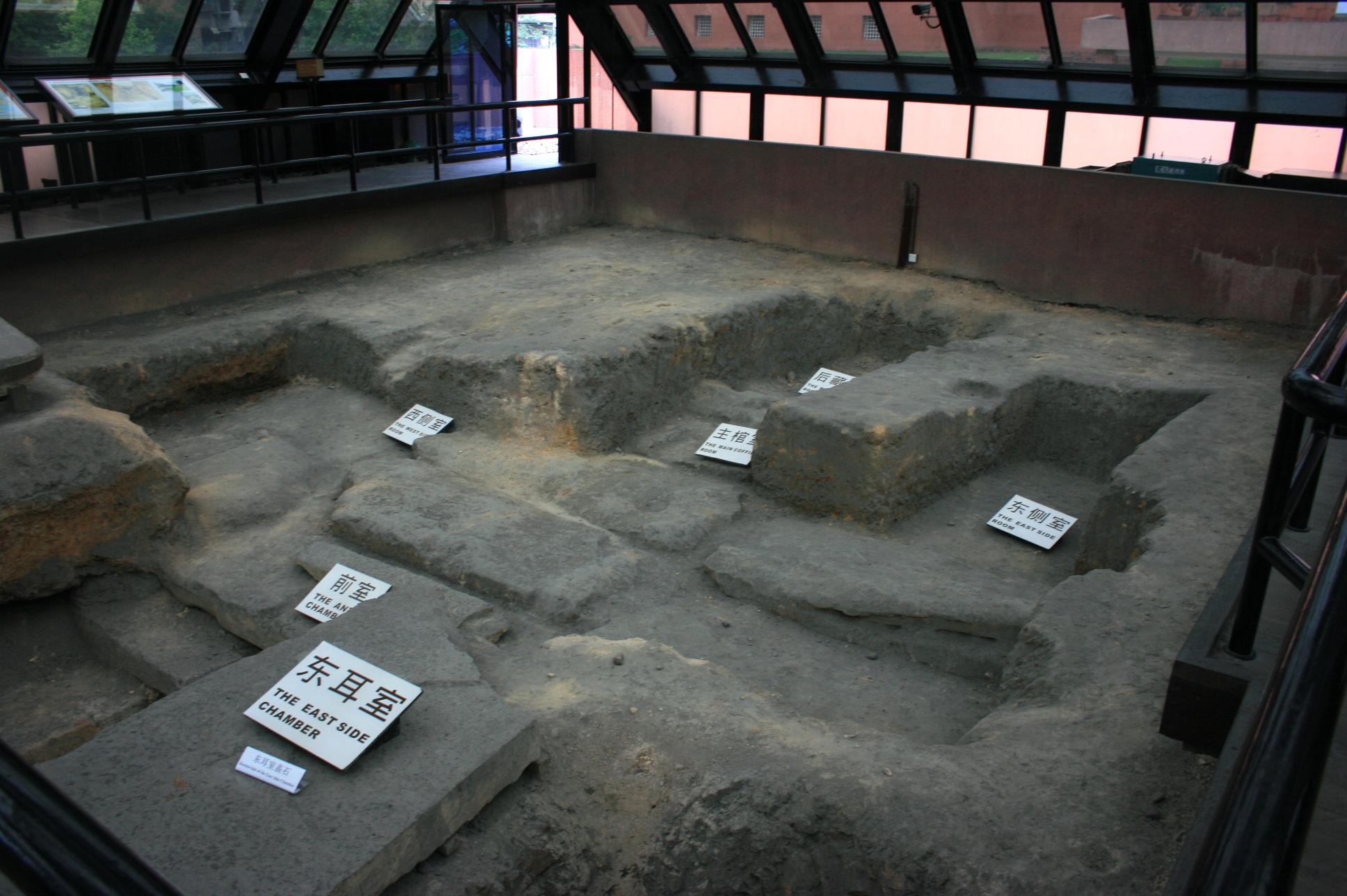
View of the tomb of Zhao Mo from above

The tomb of Wen was discovered in 1983, 20 metres (66 ft) under Elephant Hill in Guangzhou on a construction site for a hotel, and has been excavated. The tomb measures 11 metres (36 ft) long and 12 metres (39 ft) wide. It is divided in seven parts, with a front chamber, east and west wing rooms, the main coffin chamber, east and west side rooms, and a back storage chamber. The tomb has yielded more than 1000 burial artifacts, and a chariot, gold and silver vessels, musical instruments, and human sacrifices were found (15 courtiers were buried alive with him to serve him in death). It is also the only tomb of the early Western Han period that has murals on its walls.

The tomb also yielded one of the oldest imperial seals discovered in a Chinese tomb: the seal, with the name "Zhao Mo", declared the royal corpse to be "Emperor Wen", the name of a Han ruler.

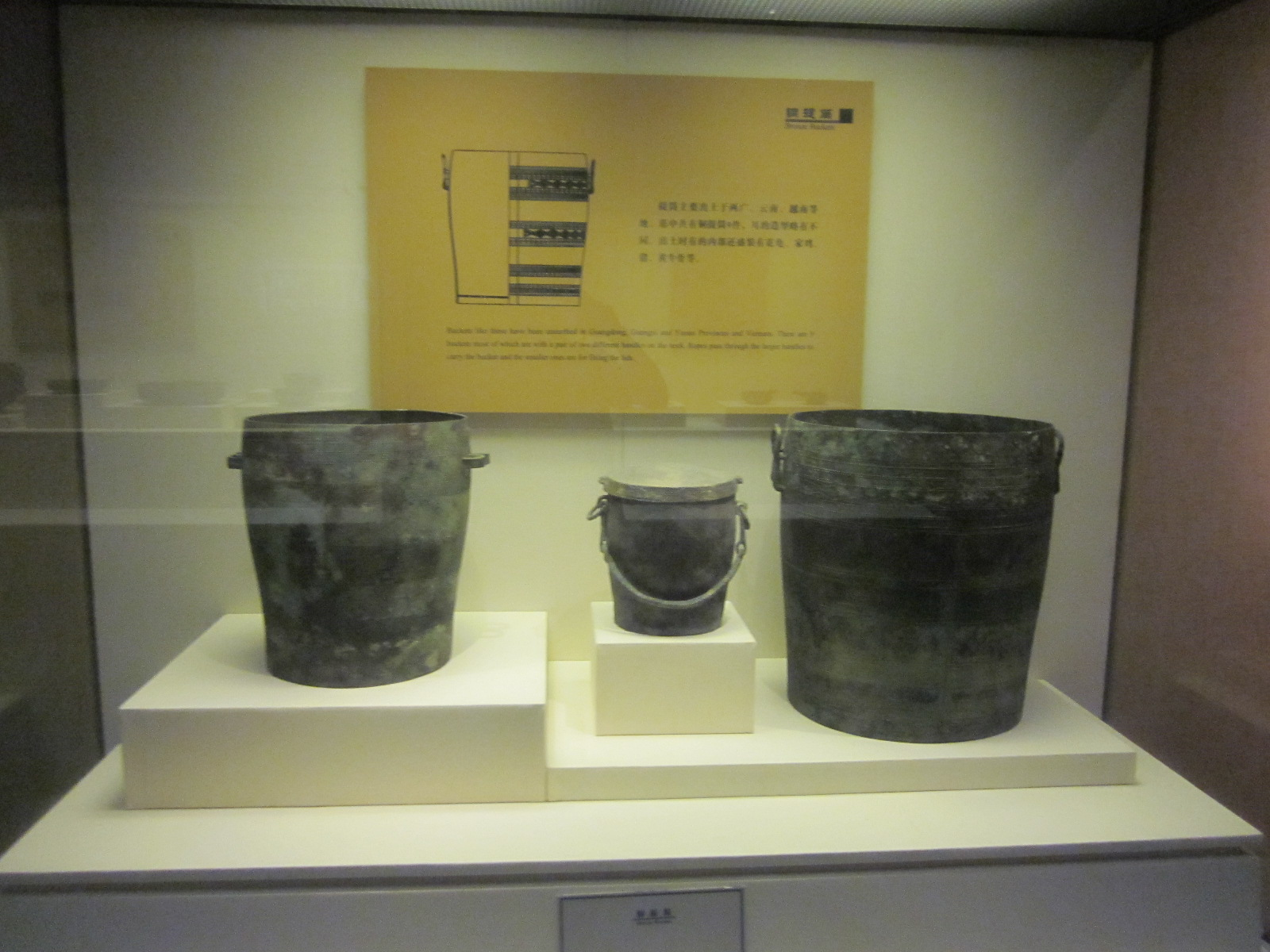
Đông Sơn bronze jars from the tomb

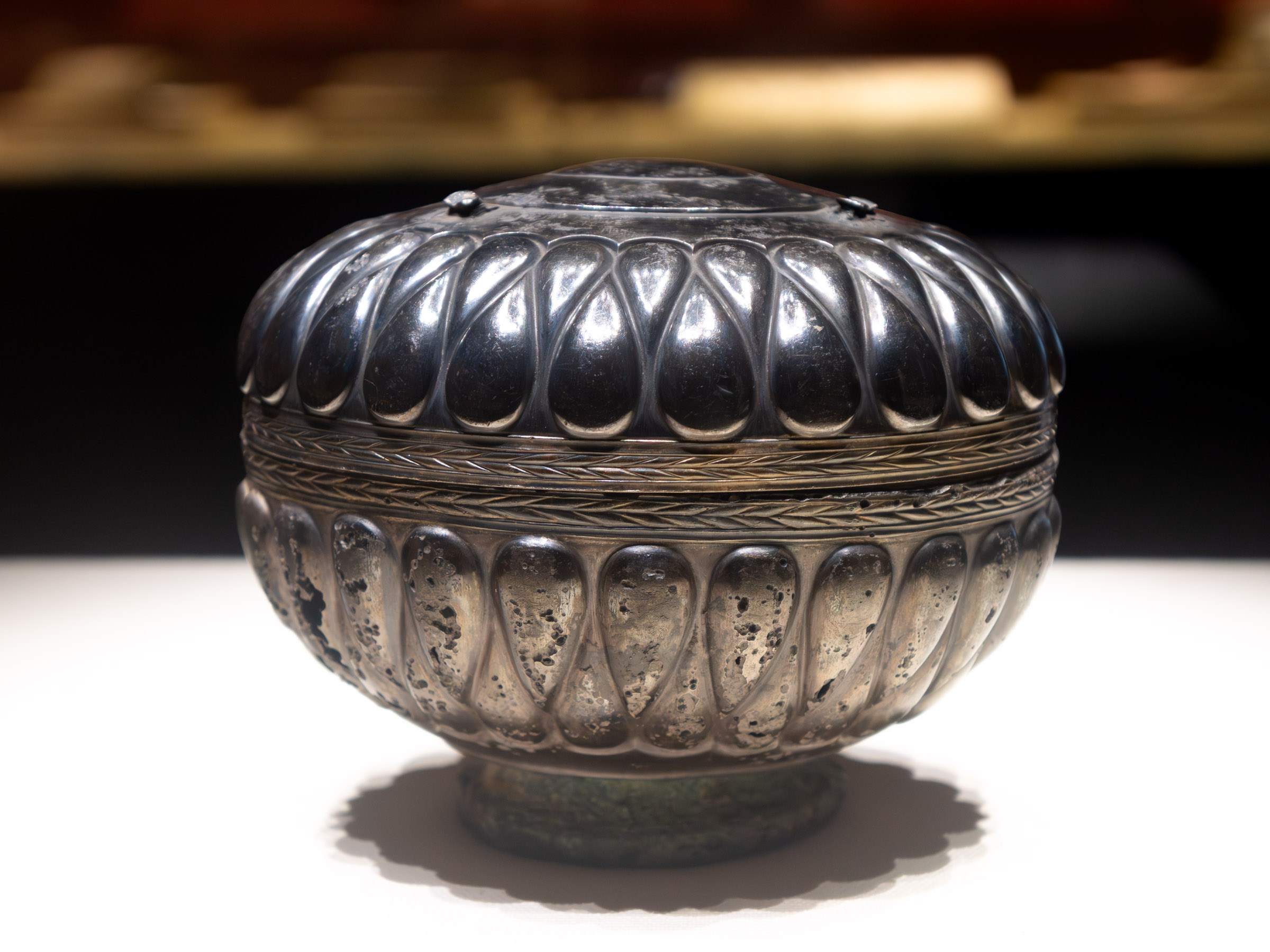
The Nanyue silver box

Alongside Chinese artifacts, pieces from the steppes and Iranian and Hellenistic Central Asian regions have been found. A Persian silver box found in the tomb is the earliest imported product found to date in China. There were also artifacts found which belonged to the Đông Sơn culture of northern Vietnam.

The Nanyue King Museum, located in Jiefang road in Guangzhou, stands on the site of the tomb of Zhao Mo.

== Bibliography ==
- Taylor, Jay (1983), The Birth of the Vietnamese, University of California Press
- Watson, Burton (1993), Records of the Grand Historian by Sima Qian: Han Dynasty II (Revised Edition, Columbia University Press

== See also ==
- Nanyue, Baiyue, and Minyue
- Panyu
- Zhao Tuo and his dynasty
- Museum of the Mausoleum of the Nanyue King
- Zhao Zhongshi
- Đông Sơn culture

Zhao Mo/ Triệu Văn Đế Triệu dynasty Died: 124 BC
Regnal titles
Preceded by Zhao Tuo (Vũ Đế)	Emperor of Nanyue; 137 BC – 124 BC	Succeeded by Zhao Yingqi (Minh Vương)
