= 110s BC =

Decade

This article concerns the period 119 BC – 110 BC.

== Events ==
=== 119 BC ===
==== By place ====
====== Roman Republic ======
- The second Dalmatian war begins.

====== China ======
- Spring: Han Chinese forces under the General-in-Chief Wei Qing and the cavalry general Huo Qubing invade the Xiongnu Empire.

- Battle of Mobei: Wei Qing crosses the Gobi Desert, defeats Yizhixie Chanyu and kills or captures 19,000 Xiongnu.
- Huo Qubing crosses the eastern Gobi, defeats and executes Bijuqi, defeats the Tuqi (Worthy Prince) of the Left (East), and captures three kings. He reaches as far as Lake Baikal.
- Failing to reconnoiter with Wei Qing's army, general Li Guang commits suicide after learning that Wei has prepared charges against him.
- Emperor Wu creates the rank of Grand Marshal and gives it to both Wei Qing and Huo Qubing, thereby making Huo's rank and salary equal to that of Wei.

- Emperor Wu suspends further campaigning against the Xiongnu due to a shortage of horses.
- Government monopolies are established in iron, salt and liquor.

=== 118 BC ===
==== By place ====
====== Roman Republic ======
- The Roman colony of Narbo Martius is founded in Gallia Transalpina.
- The Second Dalmatian War ends with victory for Rome. Lucius Caecilius Metellus assumes the surname Delmaticus.

====== Numidia ======
- Micipsa dies and Numidia, following the king's wish, is divided into three parts, a third each ruled by Micipsa's own sons, Adherbal and Hiempsal I, and the king's adopted son, Jugurtha.

====== China ======
- Emperor Wu of Han secretly executes his favourite necromancer Shao Weng for fraud.

=== 117 BC ===
- Quintus Marcius Rex triumphs over the Stoeni tribe of northern Italy.

=== 116 BC ===
==== By place ====
====== Egypt ======
- June 26 – At the death of Ptolemy VIII Physcon, Cleopatra III has chosen her younger son Ptolemy X Alexander as co-regent, but the Alexandrians force her to bring Ptolemy IX from Cyprus, of which he is governor.
- Ptolemy IX Philometor Soter II Lathyros becomes king of Egypt and claims the throne.

=== 115 BC ===
==== By place ====
====== Roman Republic ======
- Gaius Marius is praetor in Rome: he defeats Celtic tribes in modern-day Spain.
- Marcus Aemilius Scaurus defeats the Carni Celtic tribes of Northern Italy, leading to their submission to Roman rule.

====== Middle East ======
- Parthia makes a trade treaty with China.
- The Kingdom of Sheba collapses.

=== 114 BC ===
- The Scordisci defeat Gaius Porcius Cato
- Horos, son of Haruotes, a resident of the temple of Isis in Egypt, attacked a worshiper at the temple.
- Silk Road routes opened to traders and merchants, exporting goods from east to west.

=== 113 BC ===
==== By place ====
====== Roman Republic ======
- Battle of Noreia: The Cimbri and Teutones cross the Danube and enter the lands of the Celtic tribe, the Taurisci (centered in what is now Austria and north-eastern Italy). The latter sent emissaries to Rome, seeking help in dealing with the migration. The Senate sends consul Gnaeus Papirius Carbo across the Julian Alps, to deal with the migration at the head of an army (some 30,000 men). He offers guides to escort them out of the territory of the Taurisci. The guides are instructed to lead the tribes to the town of Noreia, where Carbo sets an ambush. The Cimbri manage to discover Carbo's plan, they turn the tables and defeat the Romans during an ambush. Carbo manages to escape with the remnants of his consular army (some 6,000 men) during a heavy thunderstorm. Later, he is indicted by the Senate for losing the battle, but escapes conviction by committing suicide.
- Germanic tribes attack Gaul and northern Iberia.
- Celtiberians lead a war against the Romans.

====== Syria ======
- Antiochus IX Cyzicenus becomes king of the Seleucid Empire.

====== Numidia ======
- Cirta is besieged by Jugurtha.

====== China ======
- The state of Nanyue, a vassal of the Han dynasty, agrees to submit to Han laws and receives envoys to oversee the succession of the young king Zhao Xing.

==== By topic ====
====== Art ======
- An incense burner, later found in the tomb of Liu Sheng, Prince of Zhongshan in Mancheng, Hebei, is made during the Han dynasty. It is now kept at Hebei Provincial Museum, Shijiazhuang.

=== 112 BC ===
==== By place ====
====== Roman Republic ======
- The Roman Senate declares war against Jugurtha following the Siege of Cirta (ends 105 BC).

====== Asia ======
- Han-Nanyue War

- Lü Jia, Premier of the Han vassal state of Nanyue, opposes increased Han control and refuses to appear before the king of Nanyue and the envoys of Han. He rebels against the Han when Emperor Wu sends an armed force of 2,000 men to kill him and his allies. Lü kills king Zhao Xing and his regent, Queen Dowager Jiu, massacres the Han force, and installs Zhao Jiande as king.
- Autumn – Emperor Wu launches a major invasion of Nanyue, sending five riverine fleets to invade under Lu Bode, Yang Pu and three former Yue generals.
- The king of Dongyue, Zou Yushan, sends an army to link up with Yang Pu, but he secretly sends an envoy to Zhao Jiande and halts the transport fleet to await the war's outcome, claiming that the weather is preventing its advance.

- Emperor Wu executes his favourite necromancer Luan Da for fraud.

=== 111 BC ===
==== By place ====
====== Roman Republic ======
- The city of Rome is devastated by fire.
- Jugurtha, king of Numidia, bribes the commander Lucius Calpurnius Bestia and Roman friends to secure easy terms. He is given a safe conduct to Rome in order to account for his actions in the Roman Senate. Jugurtha contemptuously bribes his way through all difficulties.

====== China ======
- Han conquest of Nanyue

- In winter, the Han general Yang Pu captures Xunxia Gorge and Shimen and defeats the Nanyue army. He and Han general Lu Bode then attack the Nanyue capital Panyu and receive its surrender. Nanyue's King Zhao Jiande and Premier Lü Jia are captured in flight and killed.
- Nanyue's ally Cangwu submits to the Han dynasty, and Nanyue is divided into nine prefectures. The Han dynasty thereby extends its control to modern-day North Vietnam.

- Han-Xiongnu War: the Han generals Gongsun He and Zhao Ponu invade deep into Xiongnu territory, Gongsun marching from Wuhuan and Zhao from Lingju. However, neither come upon a Xiongnu army. There follows a period of several years in which the Han and Xiongnu seek to establish peace.
- Han-Dongyue War

- Autumn – After learning that Yang Pu had suggested an invasion of Dongyue to Emperor Wu of Han, Dongyue's king, Zou Yushan, declares himself 'Emperor Wu' and sends an army under Zou Li to invade Han territory. They capture Baisha, Wulin and Meiling, and the Han Treasurer Zhang Cheng is executed for avoiding the Dongyue army.
- Emperor Wu of Han sends two maritime fleets and three armies, including an army under Yang Pu, to invade Dongyue.

=== 110 BC ===
==== By place ====
====== Roman Republic ======
- Jugurtha, king of Numidia, defeats a Roman army under Aulus Postumius Albinus.

====== Asia ======
- Han conquest of Dongyue

- In winter, the Han general Yang Pu retakes Wulin, and a faction of Dongyue nobles kill their king Zou Yushan before surrendering to the Han general Han Yue.
- Emperor Wu of Han annexes Dongyue and Minyue and relocates their population to the area between the Yangtze and Huai rivers.

== Births ==
118 BC

- Lucius Licinius Lucullus, Roman consul (d. 56 BC)

117 BC

- Ptolemy XII Auletes, king (pharaoh) of Egypt (d. 51 BC)

116 BC

- Marcus Terentius Varro (aka "Varro"), Roman scholar and writer (d. 27 BC)

115 BC

- Marcus Licinius Crassus, Roman general and consul (d. 53 BC)

114 BC

- Lucius Orbilius Pupillus, Roman grammarian and writer
- Publius Cornelius Lentulus Sura, Roman consul (d. 63 BC)
- Quintus Hortensius, Roman consul and orator (d. 50 BC)

111 BC

- Spartacus, Roman slave and rebel leader (d. 71 BC, presumably)

110 BC

- Asander, king of the Bosporan Kingdom (d. 17 BC)
- Hillel the Elder, Jewish religious leader (approximate date) (d. AD 10)
- Marcus Petreius, Roman general and politician (d. 46 BC)
- Titus Pomponius Atticus, Roman banker (d. 32 BC)

== Deaths ==
119 BC

- Di Shan, Chinese politician of the Han dynasty
- Li Guang, Chinese general of the Han dynasty

118 BC

- Marcus Porcius Cato, Roman consul and orator
- Micipsa, king of Numidia (approximate date)

117 BC

- Huo Qubing, Chinese general of the Han dynasty (b. 140 BC)
- Sima Xiangru, Chinese statesman, poet, and musician (b. 179 BC)

116 BC

- June 26 – Ptolemy VIII Physcon, king (pharaoh) of Egypt (b. c. 182 BC)
- Cleopatra II, queen of Egypt (b. c. 185 BC)
- Zhang Tang, Chinese official and politician

115 BC

- Publius Mucius Scaevola, Roman consul and jurist
- Quintus Caecilius Metellus Macedonicus, Roman consul (b. c. 210 BC)

114 BC

- Zhang Qian, Chinese explorer and diplomat (b. 195 BC)

113 BC

- Decimus Junius Brutus Callaicus, Roman consul and general (b. 180 BC)
- Liu Sheng, Chinese prince of the Han dynasty
- Zhang Qian, Chinese explorer, official and diplomat (b. 164 BC)

112 BC

- Adherbal, king of Numidia
- Cleopatra IV, queen of Egypt
- Zhao Xing, ruler of Nanyue

111 BC

- Tryphaena, queen consort of the Seleucid Empire
- Zhao Jiande, last king of Nanyue (or Nam Viet)

110 BC

- Sima Tan, Chinese astrologist and historian
