= Zhao dynasty =

Ruling house of the Nanyue kingdom

Coordinates: 23.1404°N 113.2560°E

Nanyue 南越國 Nam Việt Quốc
- 204 BC–111 BC
- Location of Nanyue at its greatest extent
- Capital: Panyu
- Common languages: Old Yue language
- Religion: Vietnamese folk religion Chinese folk religion local Shamanism
- Demonym: Triệu dynasty
- Government: Monarchy
- Emperor (Hoàng đế)
  - 204–137 BC (first): Zhao Tuo (Triệu Vũ Đế)
  - 112–111 BC (last): Zhao Jiande (Triệu Dương Vương)
- Military dictators (de facto)
  - 130/124-111 BC: Lü Jia (Lữ Gia)
- History
  - Qin-Baiyue war: 221 BC
  - Established: 204 BC
  - First tribute to Han dynasty: 196 BC
  - Zhao Tuo accession: 183 BC
  - Conquest of Âu Lạc: 179 BC
  - Second tribute to Han dynasty: 179 BC
  - Han conquest of Nanyue: 111 BC
  - Disestablished: 111 BC

Population
  - 111 BC estimate: 1,302,805
Preceded by	Succeeded by
Thục dynasty; Qin dynasty	Han dynasty; First Era of Northern Domination
- Today part of: Vietnam; China

Triệu
- Country: Kingdom of Nam Việt
- Founded: 3rd century BC
- Founder: Triệu Đà
- Final ruler: Triệu Kiến Đức
- Titles: Emperor of Nam Việt/ King of Nanyue
- Estate: Panyu (Phiên Ngung)
- Deposition: 111 BC

The Zhao dynasty (Chinese: 趙朝) or Triệu dynasty (Vietnamese: Nhà Triệu, 茹趙) ruled the kingdom of Nanyue, which consisted of parts of southern China as well as northern Vietnam. Its capital was Panyu, in modern Guangzhou. The founder of the dynasty, Zhao Tuo (Triệu Đà), was a Chinese general from Hebei and originally served as a military governor under the Qin dynasty. He asserted the state's independence in 207 BC as the Qin dynasty was collapsing. The ruling elite included both native Yue and immigrant Han peoples. Zhao Tuo conquered the Vietnamese state of Âu Lạc and led a coalition of Yuè states in a war against the Han dynasty, which had been expanding southward. Subsequent rulers were less successful in asserting their independence and the Han dynasty finally conquered the kingdom in 111 BC.

== Historiography ==
The scholar Huang Zuo produced the first detailed published history of Nanyue in the fifteenth century. Chinese historians have generally denounced Nanyue as separatists from the Han dynasty (206 BC – 220 AD), but have also praised them as a civilizing force. A particularly strident denunciation was produced by poet Qu Dajun in 1696. Qu praised Qin Shi Huang as a model of how to uphold the purity of Chinese culture, and compared Zhao Tuo unfavorably to the emperor. A more positive view of Nanyue multiculturalism was presented by Liang Tingnan in Nányuè Wŭ Zhǔ Zhuàn (南越五主傳; "Biographies of the Five Lords of Nanyue") in 1833. Cantonese refer to themselves as Yuht, the Cantonese pronunciation of Yuè/Việt. In modern times, the character 粵 (yuè) refers to Cantonese while 越 (yuè) refers to Vietnamese. But historically, these two characters were interchangeable.

Meanwhile, Vietnamese historians have struggled with the issue of whether to regard the Triệu dynasty heroically as founders of Vietnam, or to denounce them as foreign invaders. For centuries afterward, Zhao Tuo was a folk hero among the Viets, and was remembered for standing up to the Han Empire. After Lý Bí drove the Chinese out of northern Vietnam, he proclaimed himself "Emperor of Nam Việt" (Nam Việt đế; 南越帝) in 544, thus identifying his state as a revival of the Nanyue, despite obvious differences in terms of location and ethnic makeup. In the thirteenth century, Lê Văn Hưu wrote a history of Vietnam that used the Triệu dynasty as its starting point, with Zhao Tuo receiving glowing praise as Vietnam's first emperor. In the 18th century, Ngô Thì Sĩ reevaluated Zhao Tuo as a foreign invader. Under the Nguyễn dynasty, Zhao Tuo continued to receive high praise, although it was acknowledged that the original Nanyue was not in fact a Vietnamese state. The current government of Vietnam portrays Zhao Tuo negatively as a foreign invader who vanquished Vietnam's heroic King An Dương despite there being a campaign to reconsider the role of Zhao Tuo due to rising tensions between Vietnam and China. Modern Vietnamese are descended from the ancient Yue of northern Vietnam and western Guangdong, according to Peter Bellwood.

== History ==
=== Zhao Tuo ===
Zhao Tuo (r. 204–136 BC), also called Triệu Đà, the founder of the dynasty, was an ethnic Chinese born in the State of Zhao, now Hebei province. He became military governor of Nanhai (now Guangdong) upon the death of Governor Ren Xiao in 208 BC, just as the Qin dynasty was collapsing. The Qin governor of Canton advised Zhao to found his own independent kingdom since the area was remote and there were many Chinese settlers in the area. He asserted Nanhai's independence declared himself the king of Nam Việt in 204 BC, established in the area of Lingnan, the modern provinces of comprises Guangdong, Guangxi, south Hunan, south Jiangxi and other nearby areas. He ruled Nanyue and committed acts of defiance against Emperor Gaozu of Han and he severed all ties with the Han dynasty, killed many Han employees appointed by the central government and favored local customs of the Yue people. He sought a peaceful relationship with both the Qin dynasty and the succeeding Han dynasty.

In 196 BC, the Emperor Gaozu of Han sent the scholar Lu Jia to the court of Zhao Tuo. On this occasion, Zhao Tuo squatted and wore his hair in a bun, in the Yuè manner. "You are a Chinese and your forefathers and kin lie buried in Zhending in the land of Zhao", Lu told the king. "Yet now you turn against that nature which heaven has given you at birth, cast aside the dress of your native land and, with this tiny, far-off land of Yue, think to set yourself up as a rival to the Son of Heaven and an enemy state....It is proper under such circumstances that you should advance as far as the suburbs to greet me and bow to the north and refer to yourself as a 'subject'." After Lu threatened a Han military attack on Nanyue, Zhao Tuo stood up and apologized. Lu stayed at Panyu for several months and Zhao Tuo delighted in his company. "There is no one in all Yue worth talking to", said the king, "Now that you have come, everyday I hear something I have never heard before!" Lu recognized Zhao Tuo as "King of Yue". An agreement was reached that allowed legal trade between the Han dynasty and Nanyue, as the people of Nanyue were anxious to purchase iron vessels from the Han dynasty. When Lu returned to Chang'an, the Emperor Gaozu of Han was much pleased by this result.

Lü Zhi, the Han empress dowager, banned trade with Nanyue in 185 BC. "Emperor Gaozu set me up as a feudal lord and sent his envoy giving me permission to carry on trade," said Zhao Tuo. "But now Empress Lü...[is] treating me like one of the barbarians and breaking off our trade in iron vessels and goods." Zhao Tuo responded by declaring himself an emperor and by attacking some border towns. His imperial status was recognized by the Minyue, Western Ou (Âu Việt), and the Luolou. The army sent against Nanyue by Empress Lü was ravaged by a cholera epidemic. When Zhao Tuo was reconciled with the Han Empire in 180 BC, he sent a message to the Emperor Wen of Han in which he described himself as, "Your aged subject Tuo, a barbarian chief". Zhao Tuo agreed to recognize the Han ruler as the only emperor.

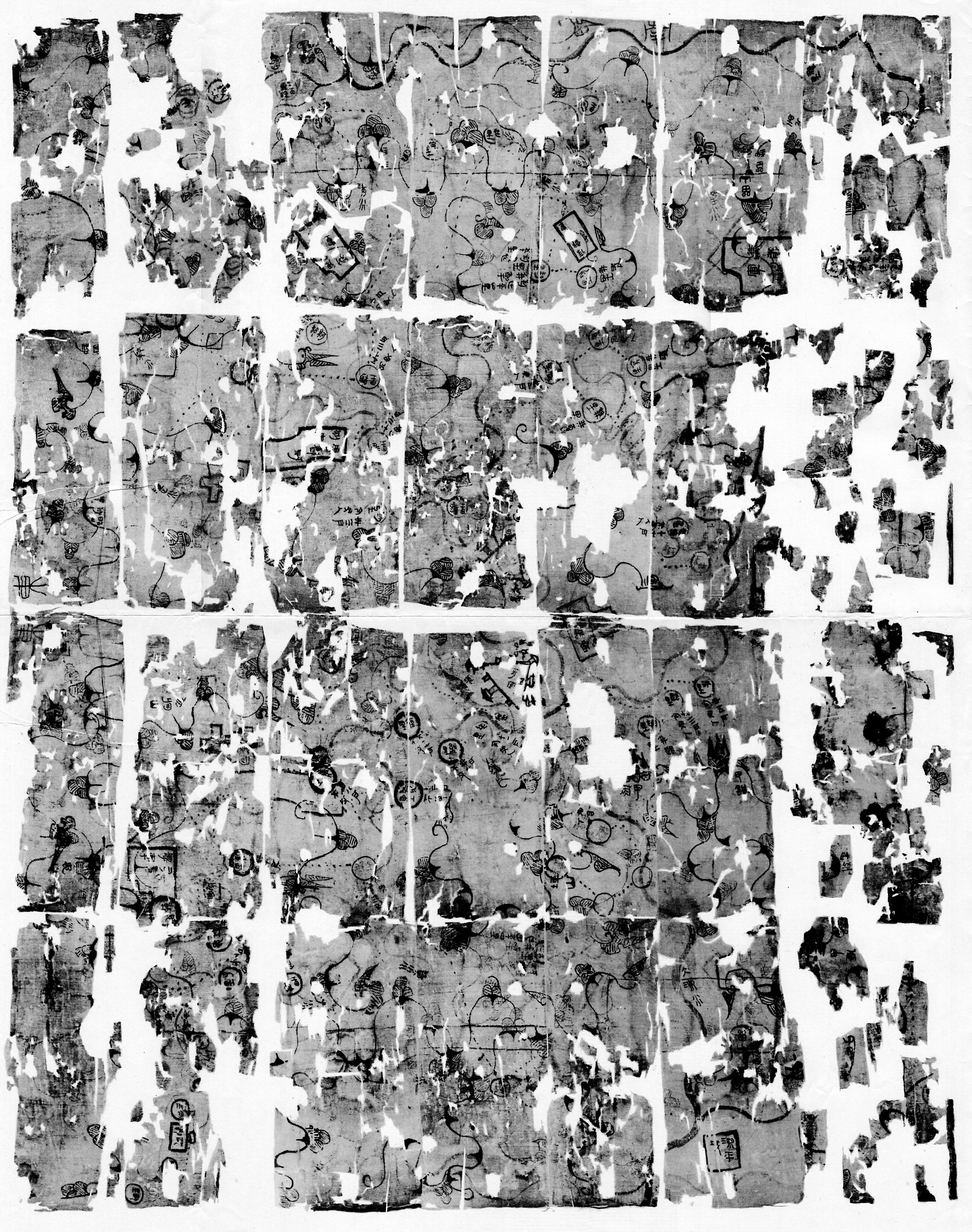
The map founded in Tomb 3 of Mawangdui Han tombs site, marking the positions of Han military garrisons that were employed in an attack against Nanyue in 181 BC.

Peace meant that Nanyue lost its imperial authority over the other Yue states. Its earlier empire had not been based on supremacy, but was instead a framework for a wartime military alliance opposed to the Han. The army Zhao Tuo had created to oppose the Han was now available to deploy against the Âu Lạc kingdom in modern-day northern Vietnam. This kingdom was conquered in 179–180 BC. Zhao Tuo divided his kingdom into two regions: Cửu Chân and Giao Chỉ. Giao Chỉ now encompasses most of northern Vietnam. He allowed each region to have representatives to the central government, thus his administration was quite relaxed and had a feeling of being decentralized. However, he remained in control. By the time Zhao Tuo died in 136 BC, he had ruled for more than 70 years and outlived his sons.

In modern Vietnam, Zhao Tuo is best remembered as a character in the "Legend of the Magic Crossbow". According to this legend, Zhao Tuo's son Trong Thủy married Mỵ Châu, the daughter of King An Dương of Âu Lạc, and used her love to steal the secret of An Dương's magic crossbow.

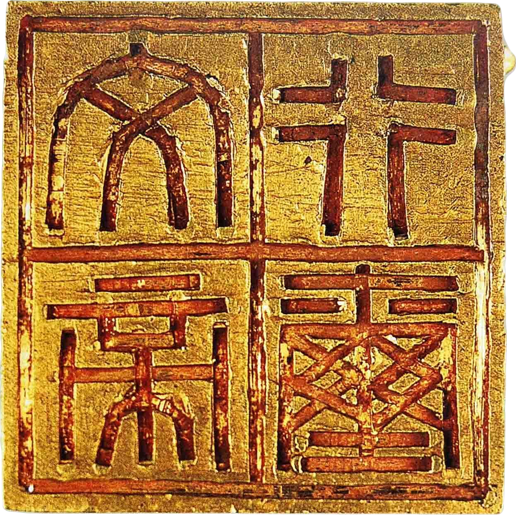
Seal of Zhao Mo, second ruler of the Triệu dynasty. The inscription says: Chinese: 文帝行玺; pinyin: Wén dì xíng xǐ; lit. 'Seal of Emperor Wén'.

=== Zhao Mo ===
Zhao Tuo died in 136 BC and was succeeded by his grandson Zhao Mo (Chinese: 趙眜; pinyin: Zhào Mò; Vietnamese: Triệu Mạt). He was 71 years old at the time of ascending to the throne. In 135 BC, the Minyue attacked and Zhao Mo requested the assistance of the Han Empire. The Emperor Wu of Han offered to "help" by sending his army, ostensibly to suppress the assist Nanyue, but with an eye of seizing the country should an occasion arise. Crown Prince Zhao Yingqi was sent to live and study in the Han court. Zhao Mo took this as a gesture of goodwill by the Emperor Wu of Han, whom he viewed as a brother, to strengthen the relationship between Han and Nanyue. Zhao Mo died in 124 BC. His mausoleum was found in Guangzhou in 1983.

=== Zhao Yingqi ===
Zhao Yingqi (Chinese: 趙嬰齊; pinyin: Zhào Yīngqí, Vietnamese: Triệu Anh Tề, r. 124–112 BC) was the crown prince when his father, Zhao Mo, died. Zhao Yingqi's appointment to kingship was a conciliatory measure to the Han emperor in Chang'an as a sign of respect. This crowned prince, Zhao Yingqi, lived most of his life in the Han dynasty where he had fathered a son by an ethnic Chinese woman surnamed Jiu (Chinese: 樛; pinyin: Jiū); In one popular theory, she was Emperor Wu's own daughter. He named the son Zhao Xing. Only when his father, Zhao Mo, died did Zhao Yingqi receive permission to go home for his father's funeral. This happened in 124 BC. Zhao Yingqi then ascended the throne of Nanyue. Not much is known about Zhao Yingqi's reign, probably because it is a short one and he was subservient to the Han emperor. His son, Zhao Xing, was only about 6 years old when he died. Owing to Zhao Xing's extreme youth, his mother Lady Jiu, became the Empress Dowager.

Zhao Yingqi's death precipitated the events that would lead to the seizure and domination of Nanyue by the Han forces.

=== Zhao Xing ===
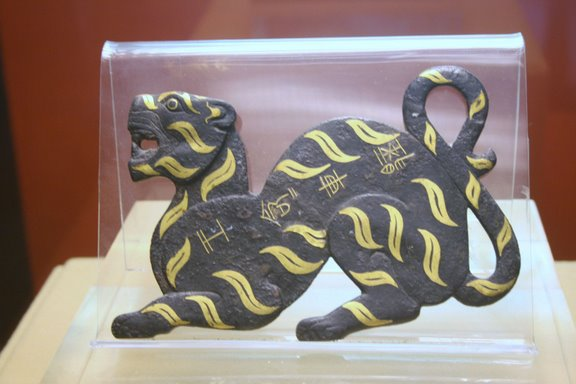
A hufu 虎符, or Tiger Tally, made of bronze with gold inlay, found in the tomb of the King of Nanyue (at Guangzhou), dated 2nd century BCE, during the Western Han; tiger Tallies were separated into two pieces, one held by the emperor, the other given to a military commander as a symbol of imperial authority and ability to command troops.

Zhao Xing (r. 113–112 BC), also called Triệu Hưng, was just 6 years old when he ascended the throne. Soon thereafter, Emperor Wu of Han summoned him and his mother, Lady Jiu, to an audience to pay homage in the Han court. The Han dynasty held Lady Jiu and Zhao Xing under the pretext that the young king needed their protection. By acquiescing to this gesture, both the empress dowager and the young emperor gave the public the impression that they were just puppets in the hands of the Han court.

With Zhao Xing in their hands and the queen dowager beheaded, the Han dynasty prepared their army for an invasion. In 112 BC, the emperor sent two of his commanders, Lu Bode and Yang Pu, along with 5,000 of his best soldiers to invade Nanyue.

=== Zhao Jiande ===
Nanyue's senior prime minister, Lü Jia, sent out the army to meet the Han at the border to repel the invasion. The army was smaller in number than the Han force. Meanwhile, word spread within Nanyue that Zhao Xing was in the hands of the Han dynasty. The Nanyue feared that if they resisted, their king would be harmed by the Han. The country was now in a state of chaos. When the Han sent more reinforcements for their army at the border, the Nanyue army was unable to hold its position. Lü Jia saw that Nanyue must have a new king to calm its people and encourage resistance. Zhao Jiande (also called Triệu Kiến Đức), Zhao Yingqi's eldest son from one of his concubines, took on the task of leading his people to war.

== Decline of the dynasty ==
Emperor Wu of Han dispatched soldiers against Nanyue. With its king being too young and inexperienced and leading an untrained, however brave army, Nanyue was only able to keep their stronghold for a while. Han crushed the Nanyue army along with Lü Jia and his King (Zhao Jiande), both resisted until the end. Based on many temples of Lü Jia, his wives and soldiers scattering in Red River Delta of modern-day northern Vietnam, the war might last until 98 BC.

After the fall of Panyu, Tây Vu Vương (the captain of Tây Vu area of which the center is Cổ Loa) revolted against the First Chinese domination from Western Han dynasty. He was killed by his assistant Hoàng Đồng (黄同).

Afterwards, Nanyue territory was divided into nine districts and incorporated into the Han dynasty as the prefecture of Jiaozhi (Giao Chỉ). Han dynasty would dominate Jiaozhi until the revolt of the Trưng Sisters, who led a revolt in AD 40.

== List of monarchs ==
Posthumous name			Given name			Reign
Chinese	Pinyin	Vietnamese	Chinese	Pinyin	Vietnamese	Reign
武帝	Wǔ Dì	Vũ Đế	趙佗	Zhào Tuó	Triệu Đà	203–137 BC
文帝	Wén Dì	Văn Đế	趙眜	Zhào Mò	Triệu Mạt	137–122 BC
明王	Míng Wáng	Minh Vương	趙嬰齊	Zhào Yīngqí	Triệu Anh Tề	122–115 BC
哀王	Āi Wáng	Ai Vương	趙興	Zhào Xīng	Triệu Hưng	115–112 BC
術陽王	Shù Yáng Wáng	Thuật Dương Vương	趙建德	Zhào Jiàndé	Triệu Kiến Đức	112–111 BC

== Nanyue culture ==
There was a fusion of the Han and Yue cultures, as shown by the artifacts unearthed by archaeologists from the tomb of Nanyue in Guangzhou. The Nanyue tomb in Guangzhou is rich in artifacts. There are a number of bronzes that show cultural influences from the Han, Chu, Yue and Ordos regions.

== Gallery ==
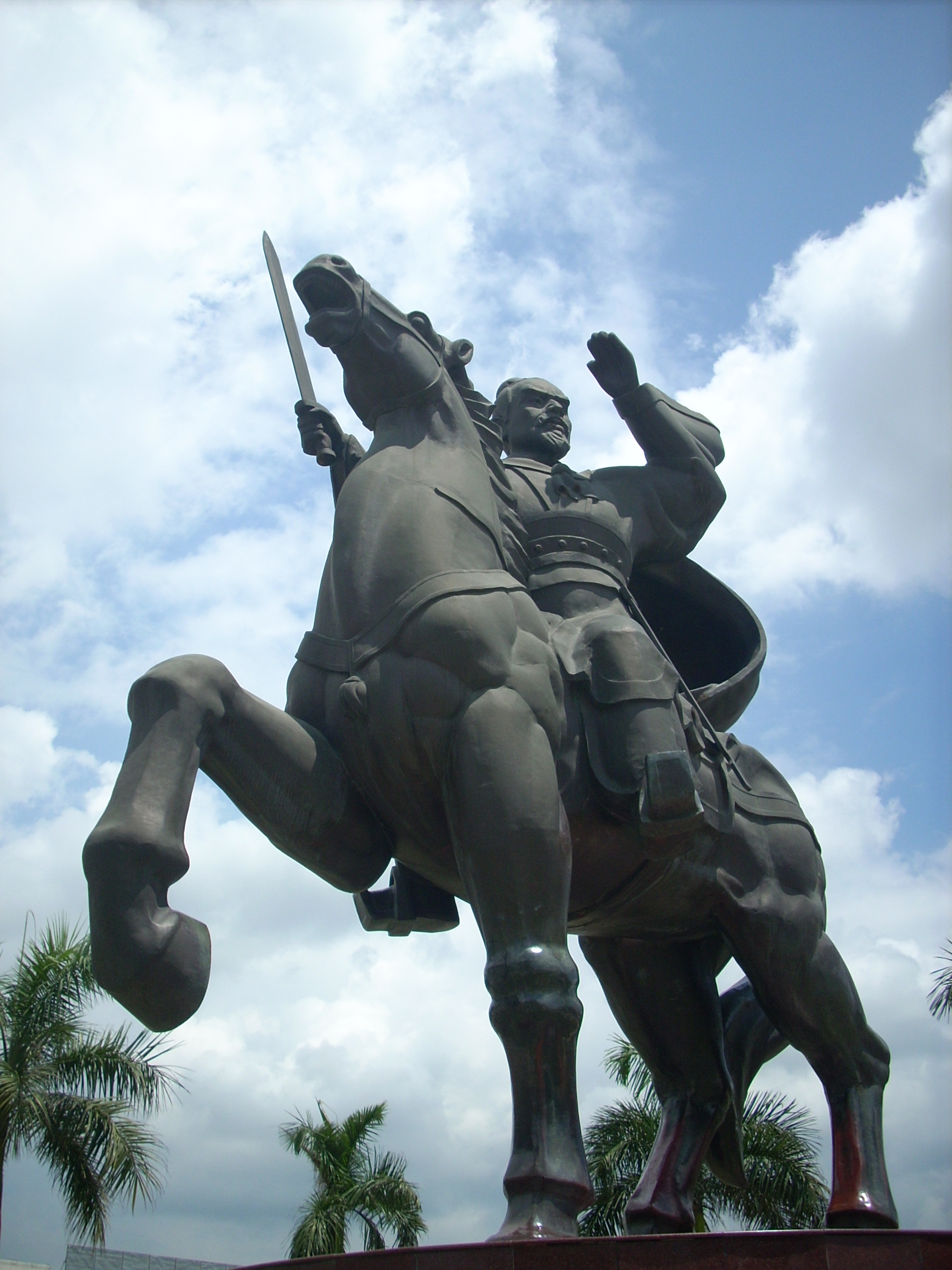
State of King Zhao Tuo (Triệu Đà)

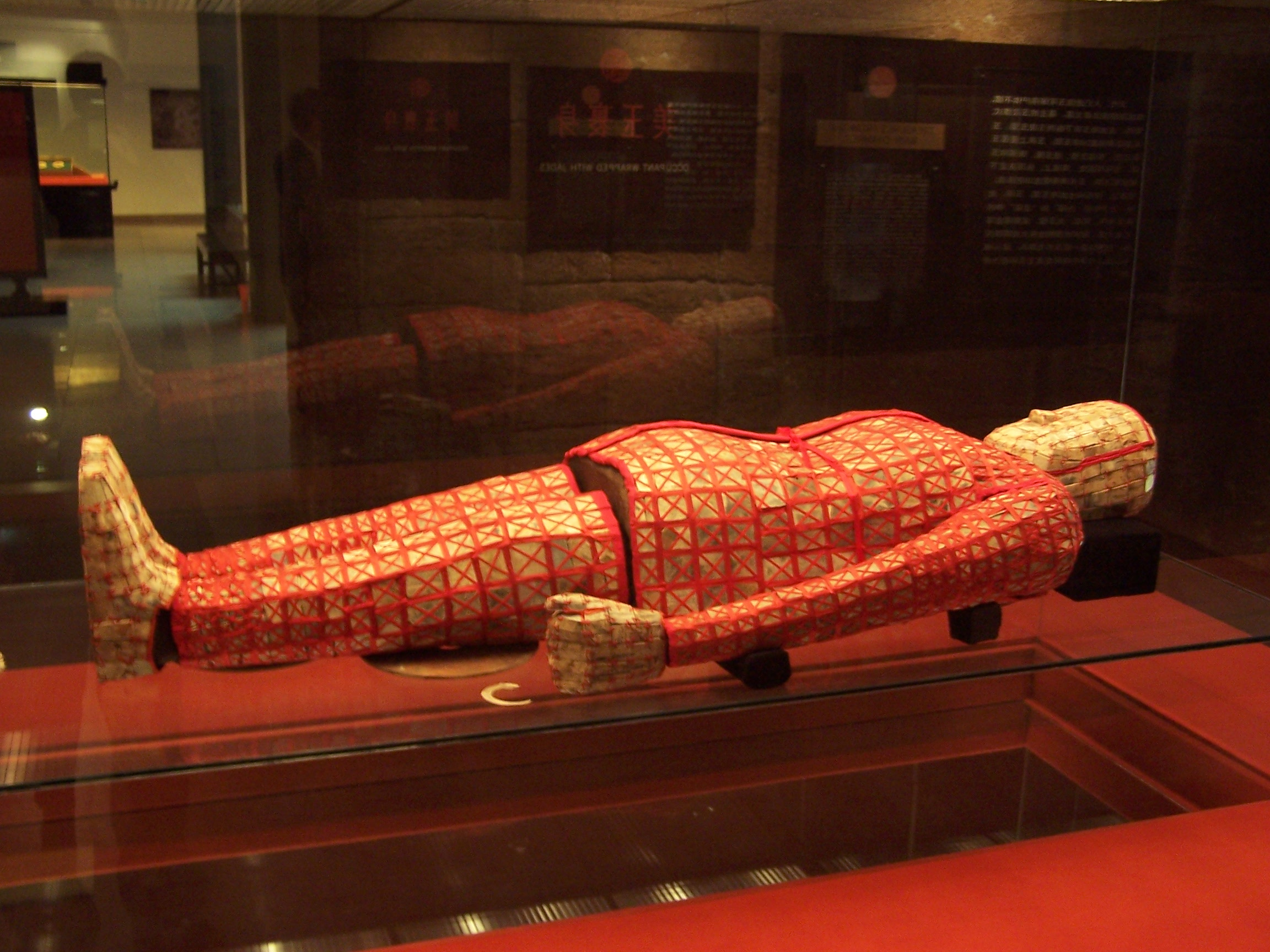
Jade burial suit of King Zhao Mo (Triệu Mạt)

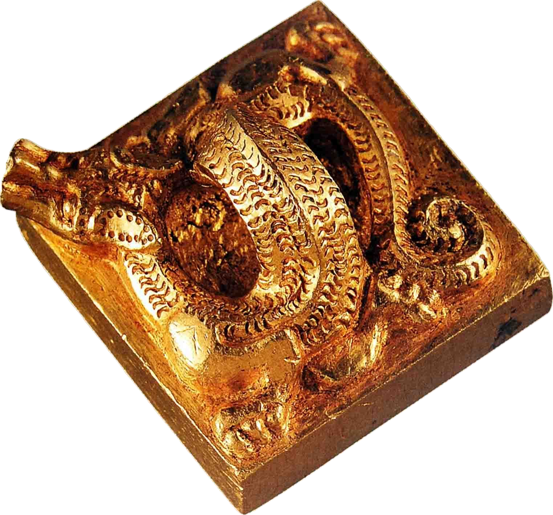
Gold seal

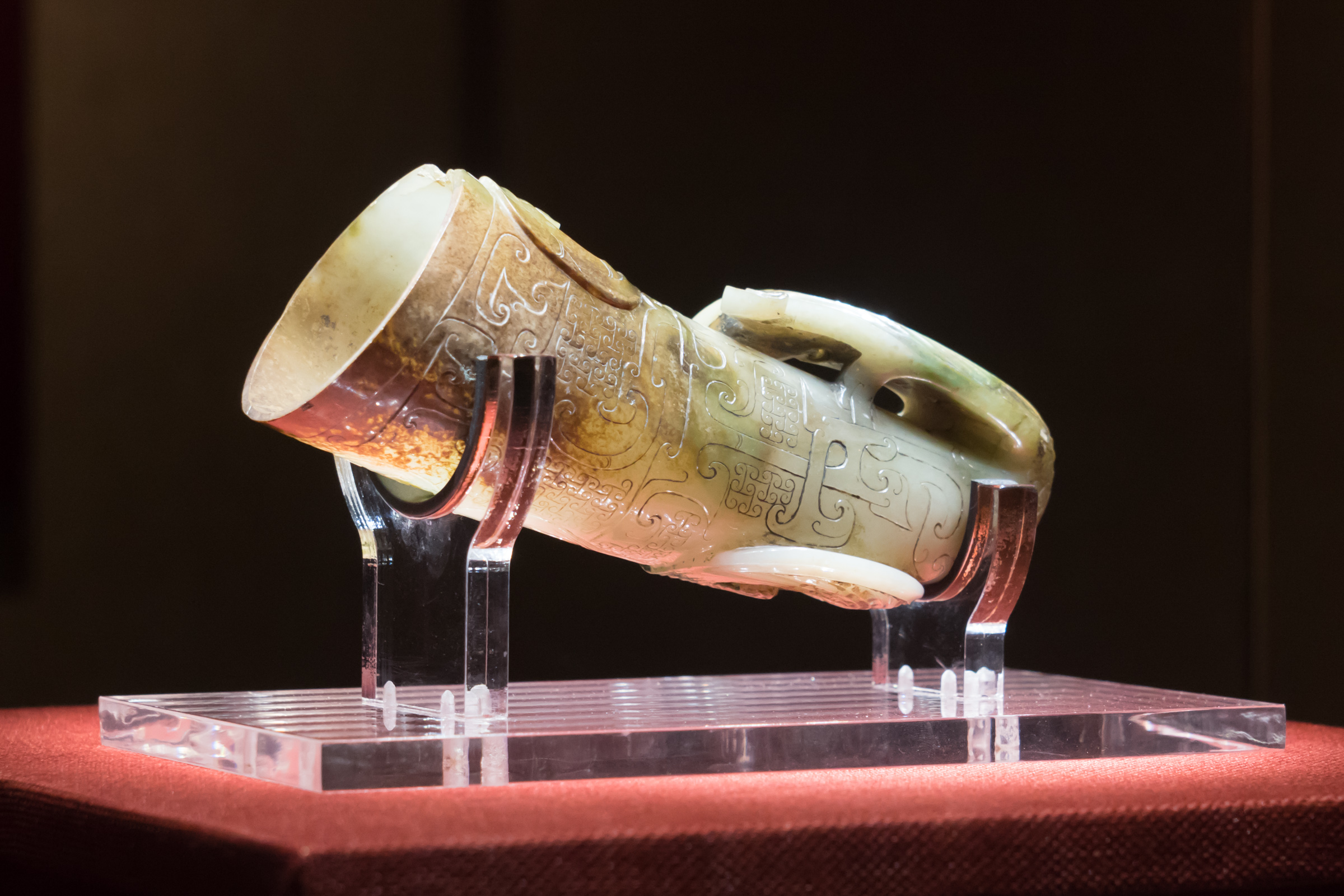
Jade Drinking Vessel in Rhino Horn Shape

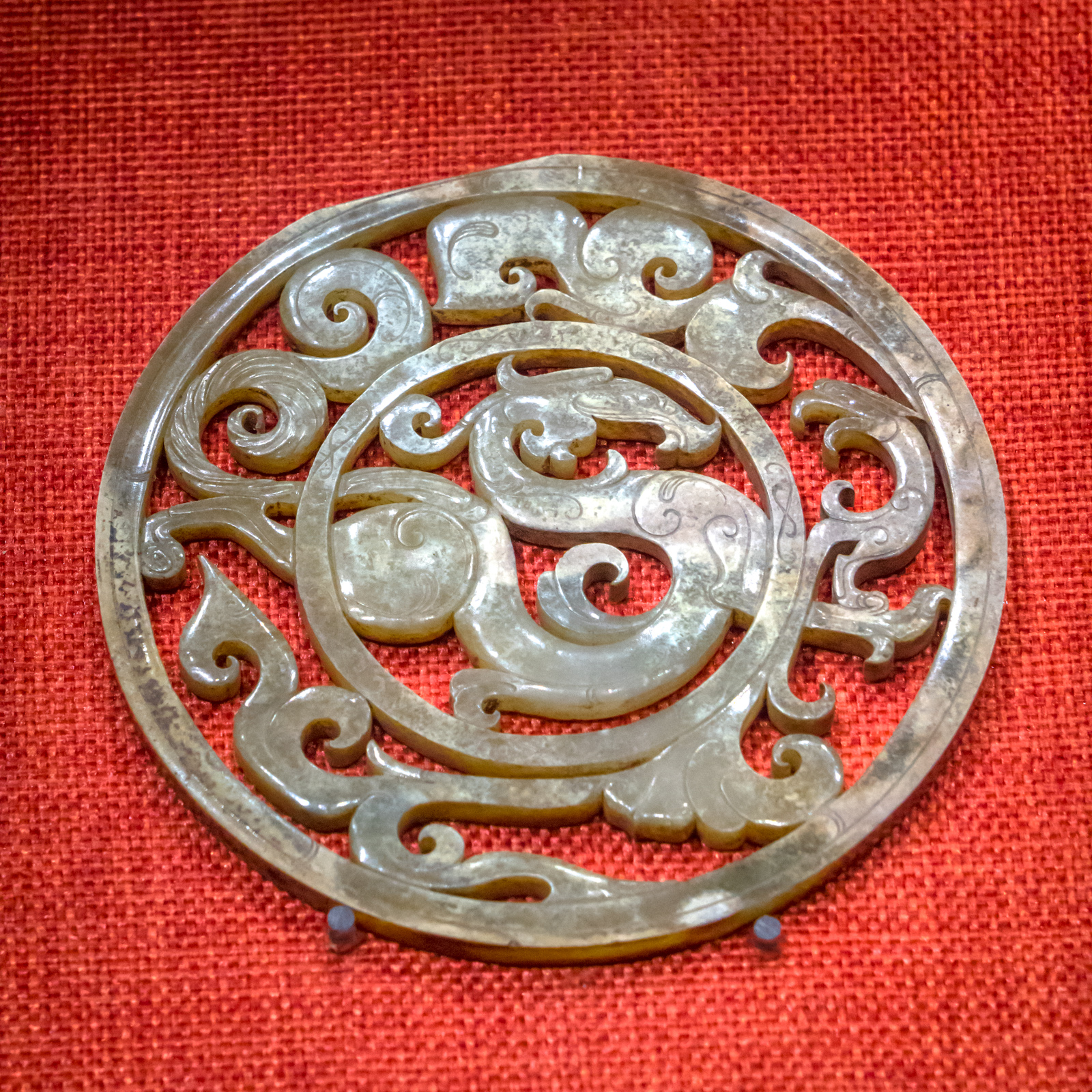
Jade Openwork Disk with Dragon and Phoenix

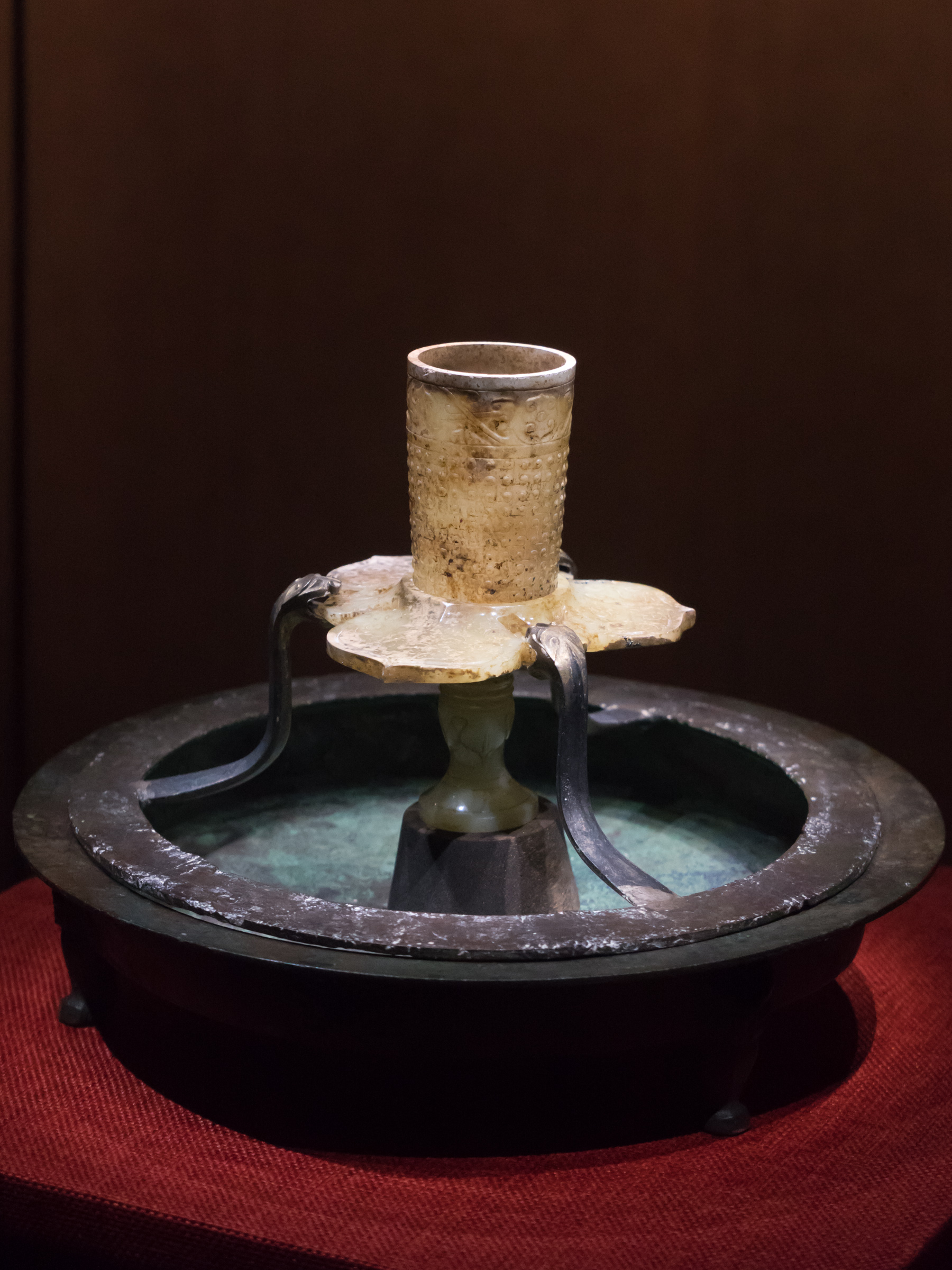
Jade Drinking Cup for Collecting Sweet Dew

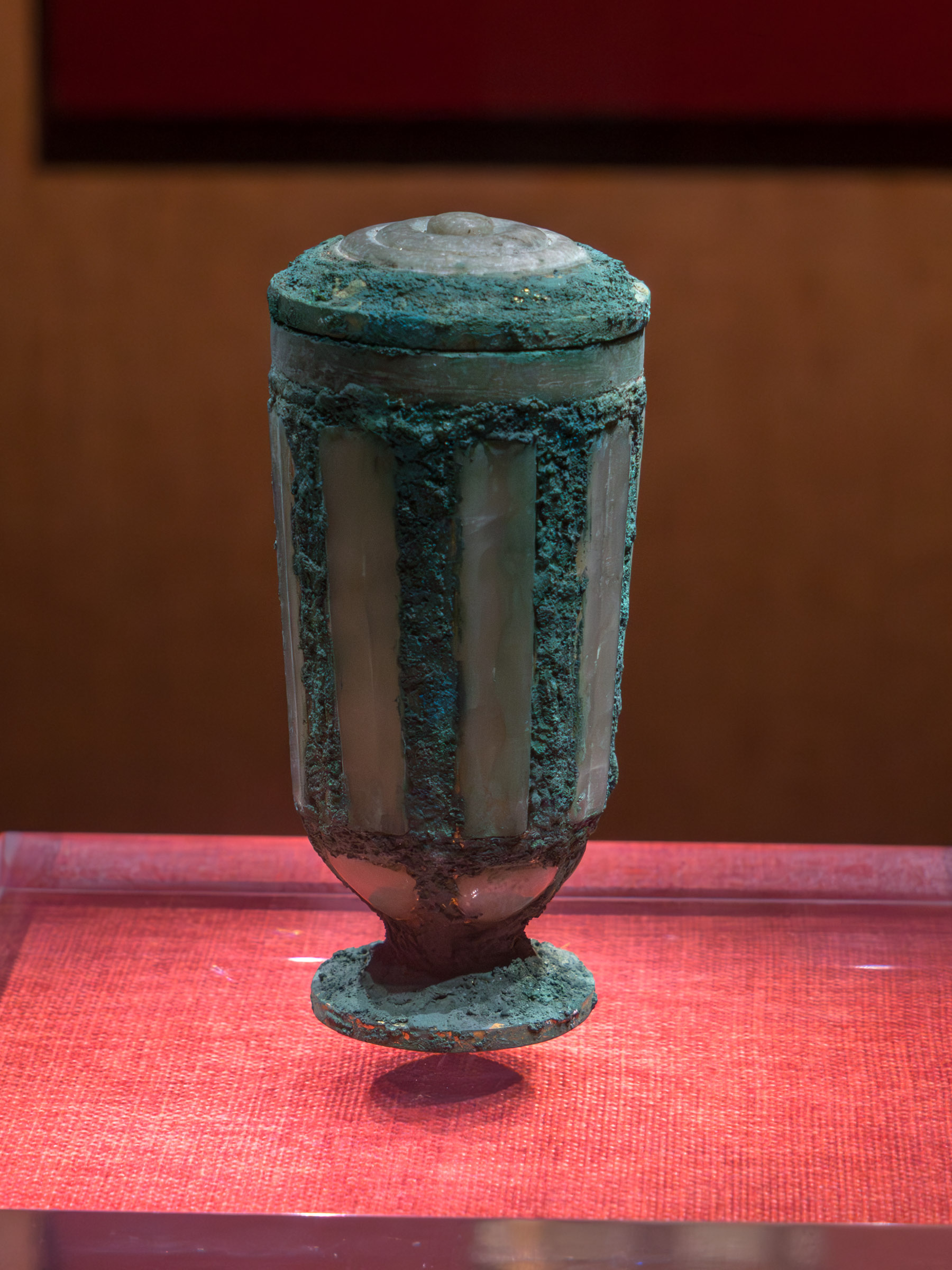
Bronze Beaker Mounted with Jade Plaques

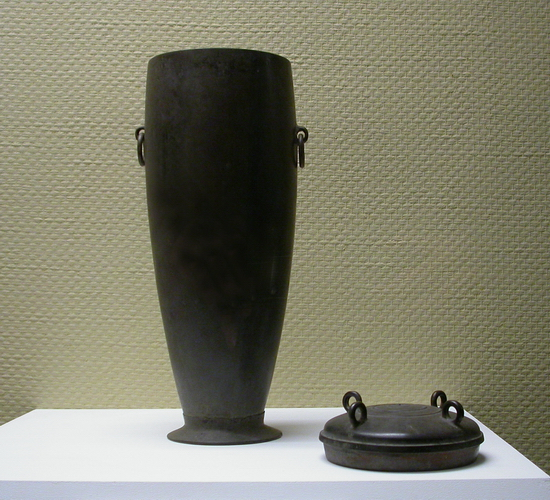
Bronze wine vessel

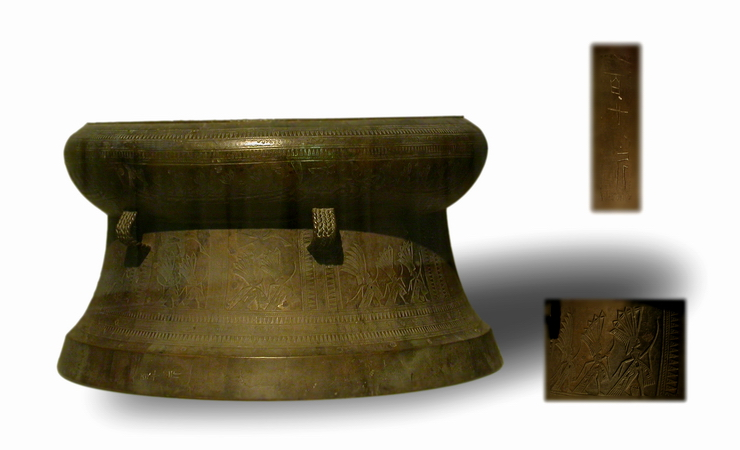
Đông Sơn bronze drum

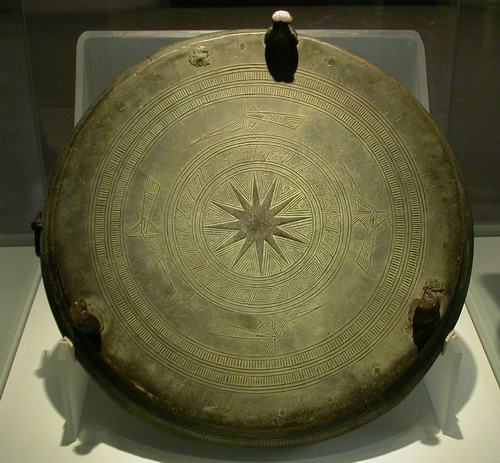
Bronze disk

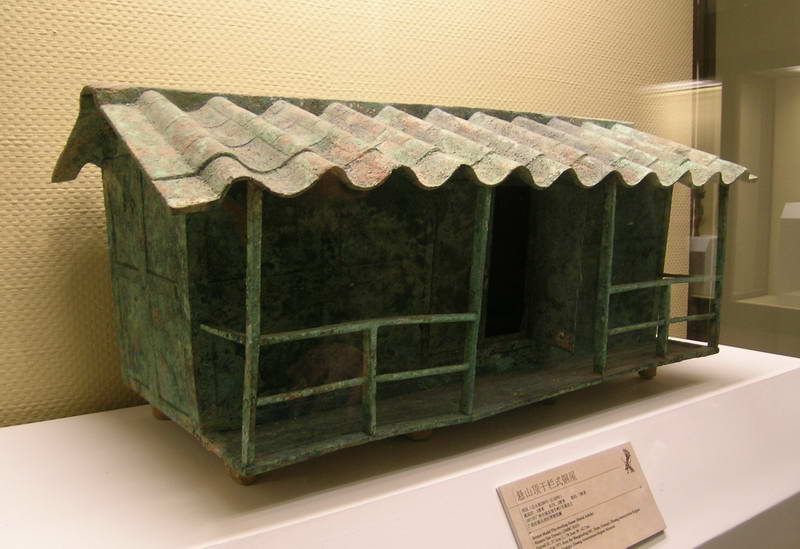
Bronze house model

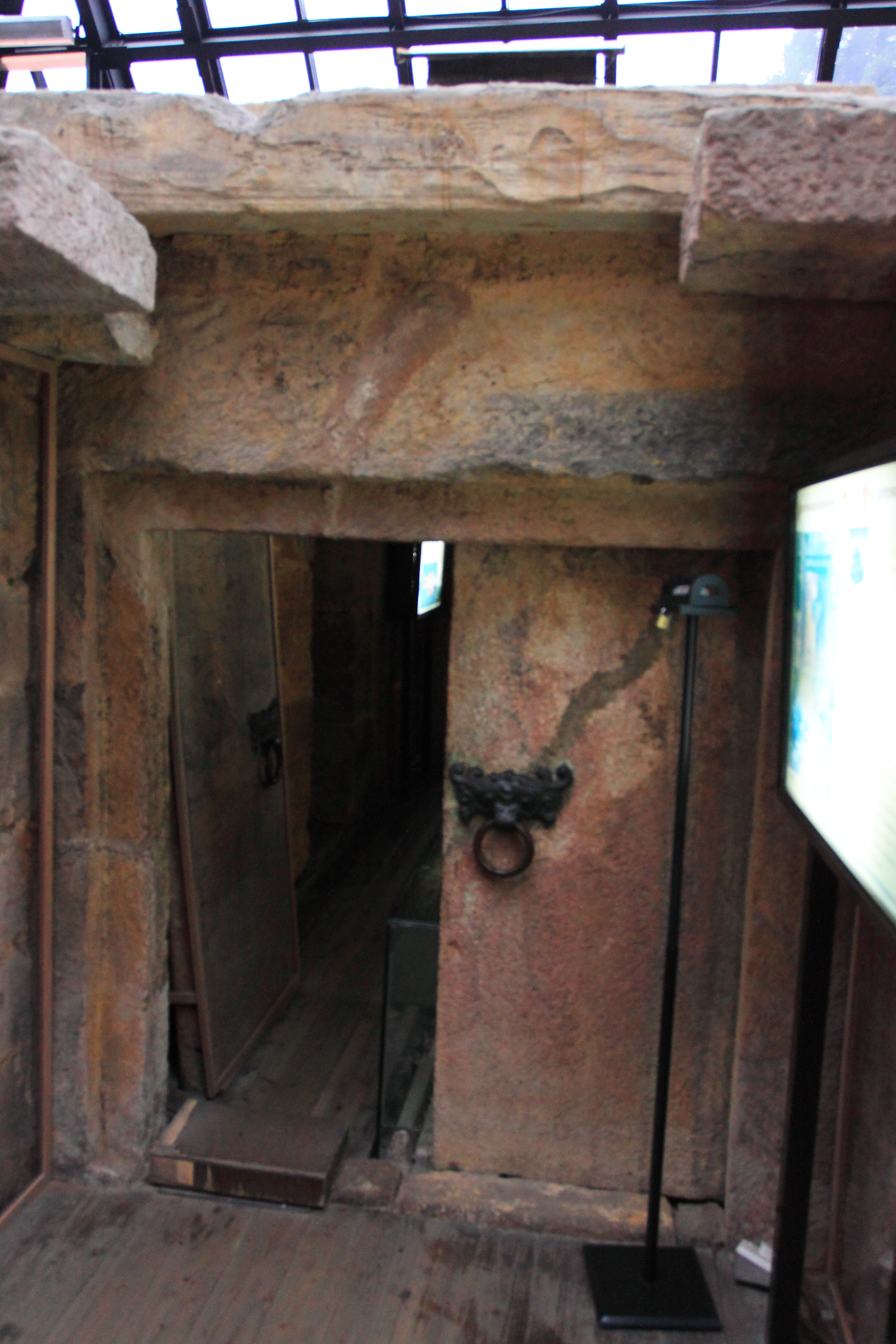
Mausoleum of King Triệu Mạt (Zhao Mo)

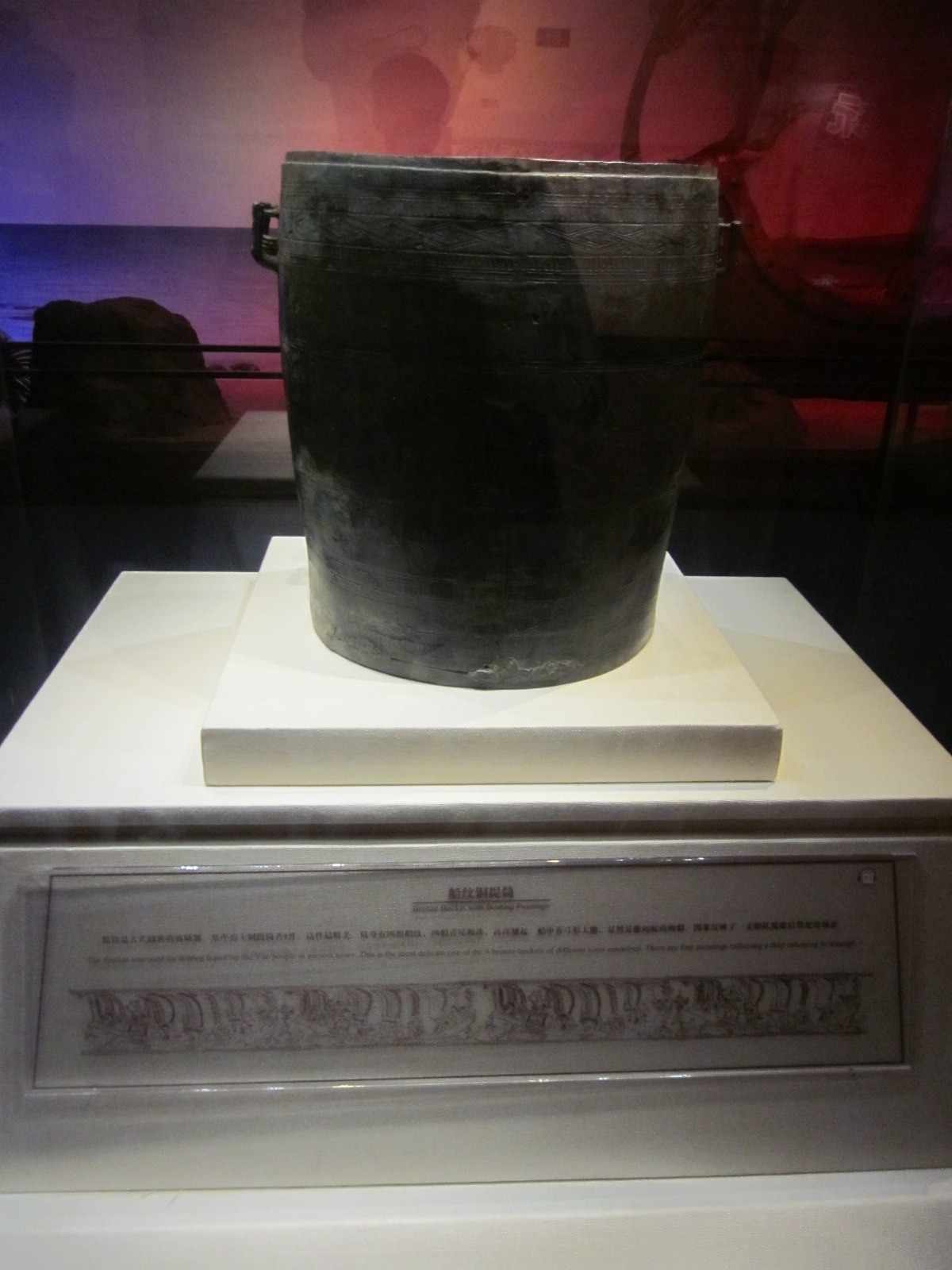
Đông Sơn bronze jar

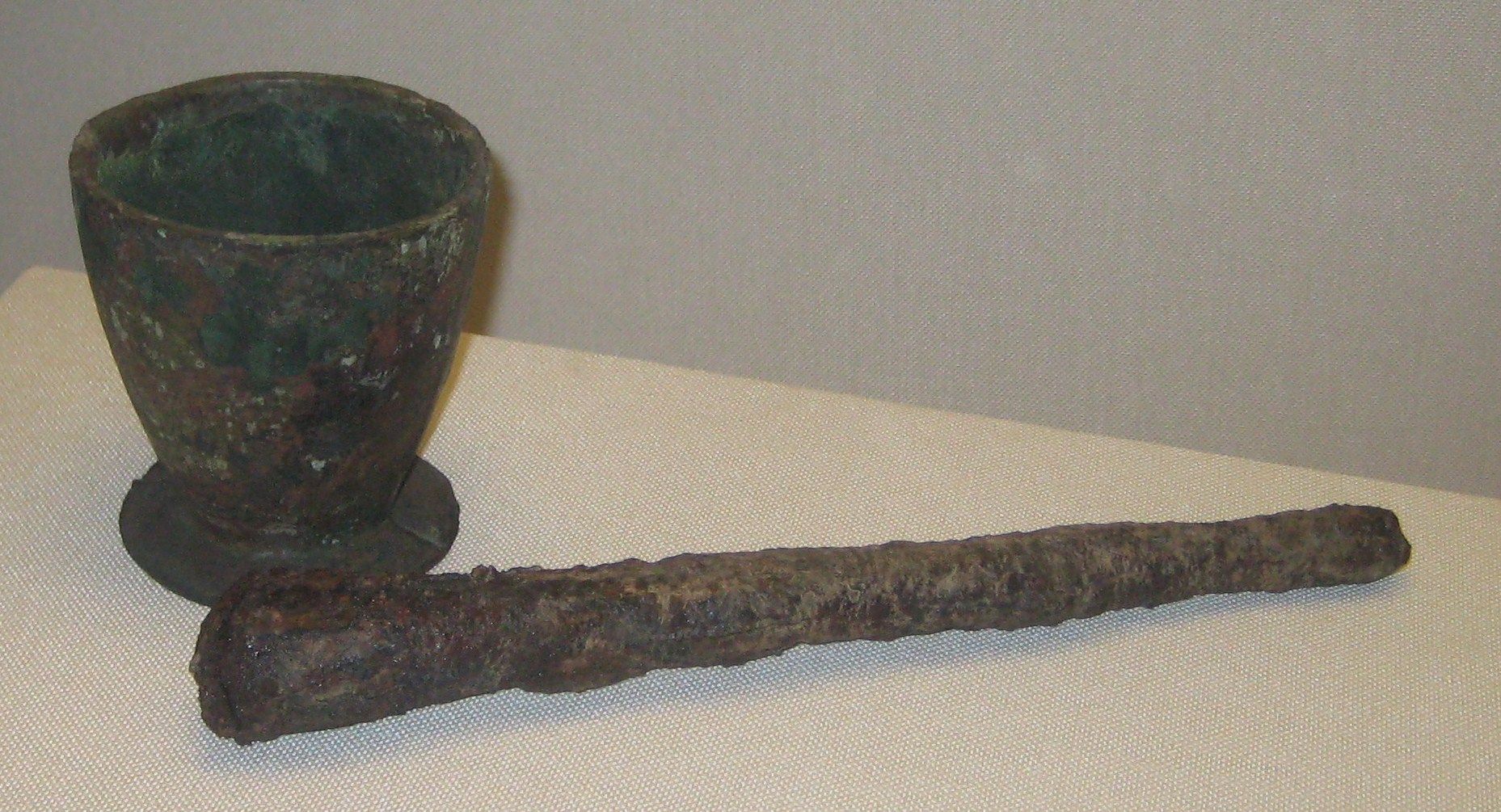
Bronze mortar and pestle

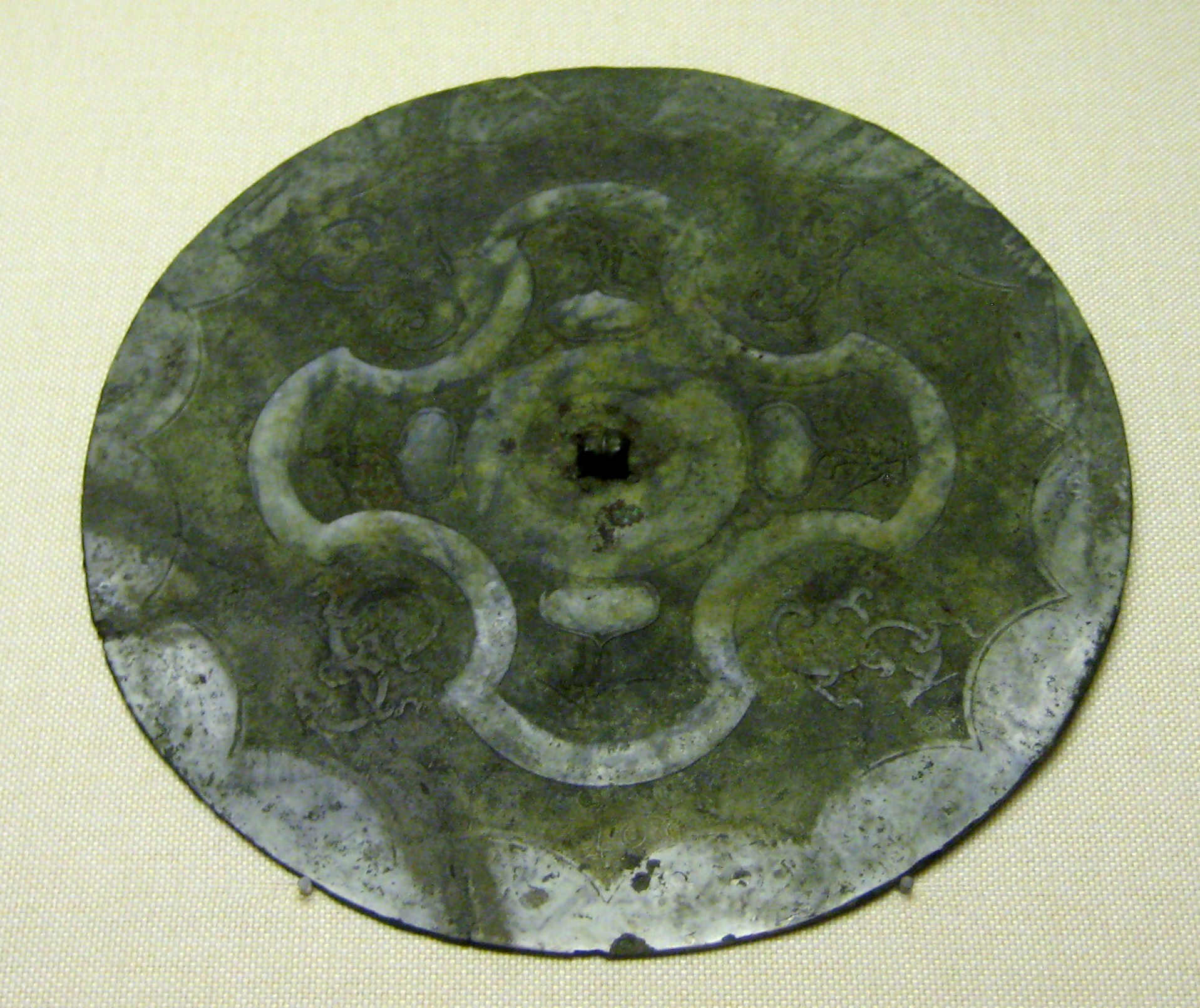
Bronze mirror inlaid with silver

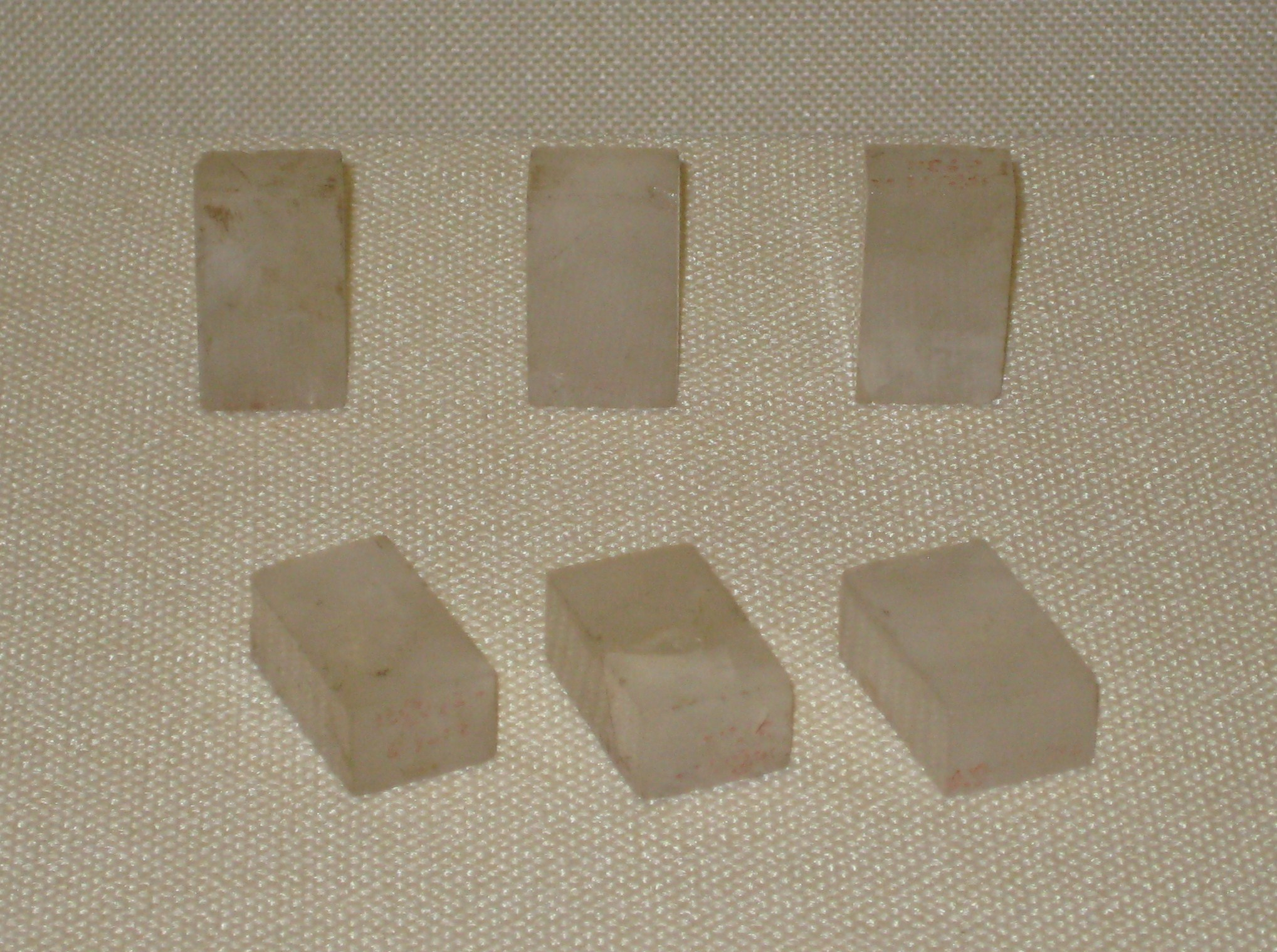
Game of Liubo

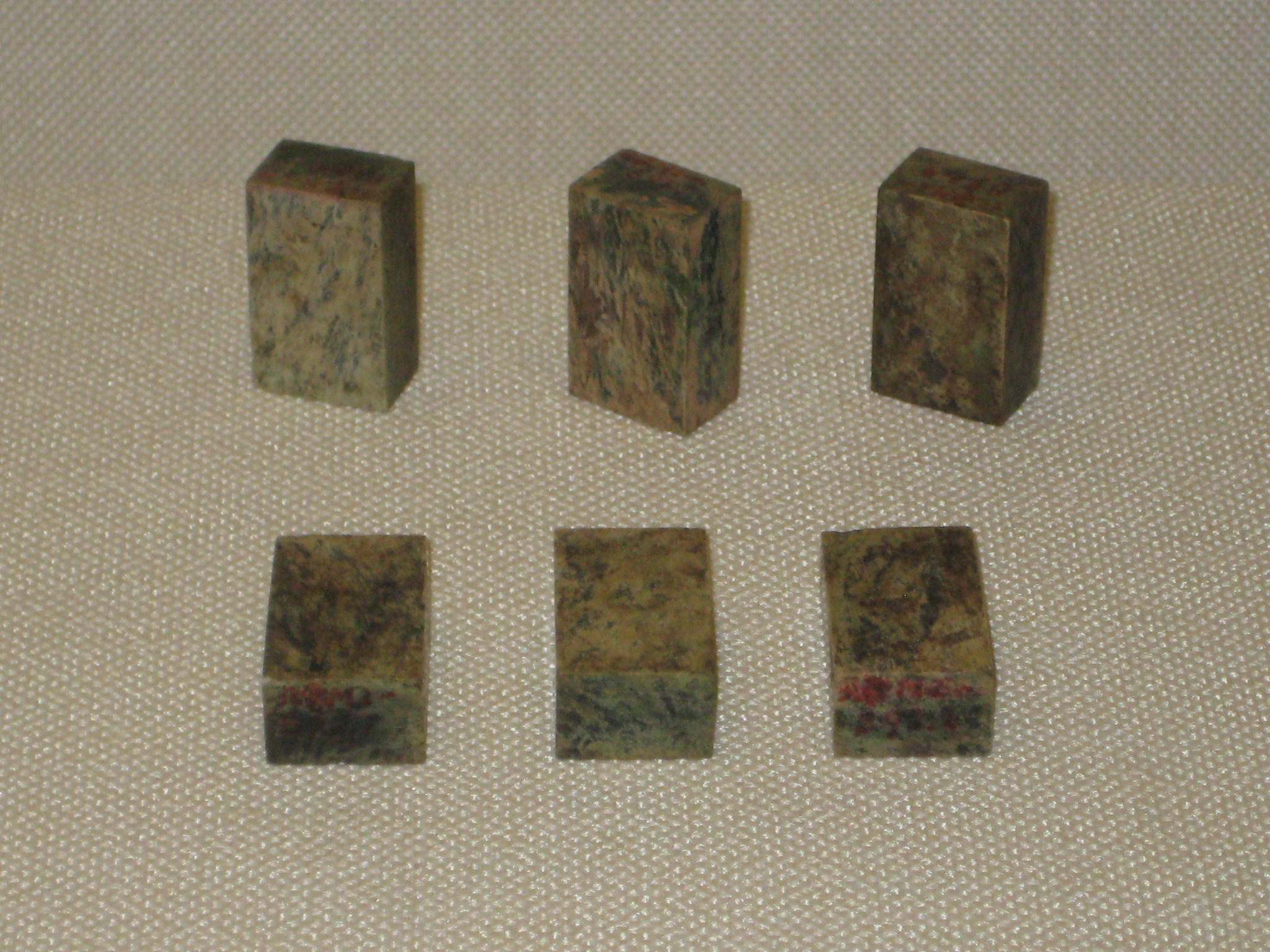
Game of Liubo

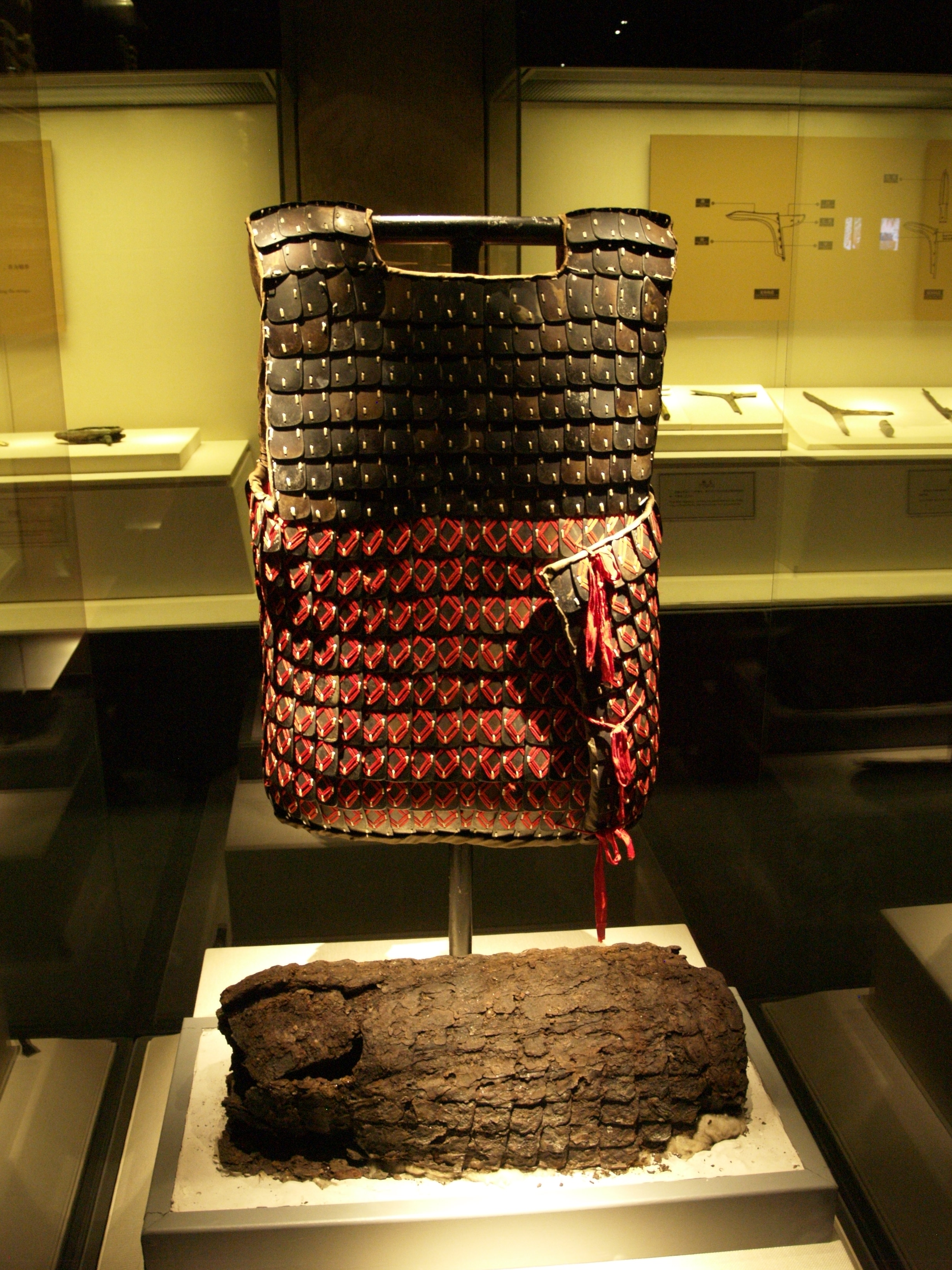
Armour with reconstructed replica

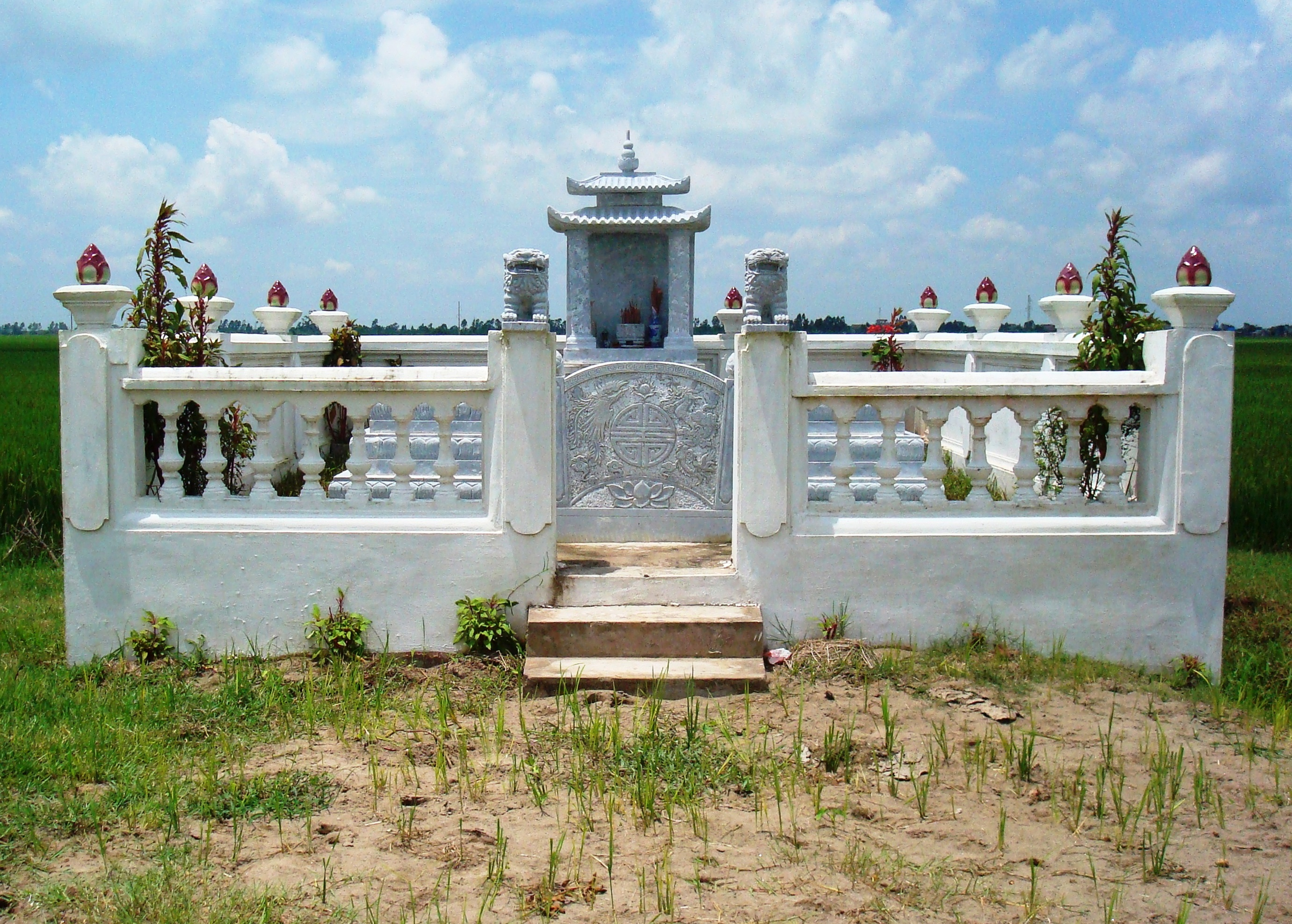
Tomb of Prime minister Lü Jia (Lữ Gia) and General Nguyễn Danh Lang

== See also ==
- An Dương Vương
- Âu Lạc
- Baiyue
- Changsha Kingdom
- Dong Son culture
- Emperor Wu of Han
- Han conquest of Nanyue
- Lü Jia (Nanyue)
- Minyue
- Museum of the Mausoleum of the Nanyue King
- Nanyue
- Panyu District
- Tây Vu Vương
- Yelang
- Zhao Tuo

== Citations ==
Preceded by Au Lac	Dynasty of Vietnam; 204–111 BC	Succeeded by First Chinese domination
