= Lingnan =

Geographic area in the south of the Nanling Mountains, China

Lingnan 岭南
- Maximum extent of the Nanyue kingdom, roughly corresponding to the geographical region of Lingnan with the exception of Central Vietnam
- Modern day-location: Guangdong, Guangxi, Hainan, Hong Kong, Macau, and North Vietnam (Tonkin)

Lingnan (simplified Chinese: 岭南; traditional Chinese: 嶺南; pinyin: lǐng nán; Jyutping: ling5 naam4; lit. 'South of the [Nanling] Mountains'; Vietnamese: Lĩnh Nam) is a geographic area referring to the lands in the south of the Nanling Mountains. The region covers the modern Chinese subdivisions of Guangdong (Canton), Guangxi (Kwangsi), Hainan, Hong Kong & Macau and Northern Vietnam.

== Background ==
The area was inhabited by the Baiyue people prior to the Qin unification of China, and was considered by the ancient Chinese court to be a tropical, uncivilized barbarian land that had no contact with the Zhongyuan, which was the cultural cradle of Chinese culture.

During the Qin dynasty, the First Emperor launched a series of campaigns to conquer the Baiyue from 221 BCE to 214 BCE, which led to the construction of the Lingqu canal that linked up waterborne transportation between the Yangtze and Pearl River. After the Qin dynasty's collapse in 206 BCE, Zhao Tuo, a Qin general serving as the magistrate of the conquered Lingnan region, proclaimed himself the king of the autonomous kingdom of Nanyue with the estuarial city of Panyu (present-day Guangzhou) as the capital, and later submitted as a vassal to the newly established Han dynasty in 180 BCE.

The Nanyue kingdom lasted for nearly a century until 112 BCE, when chancellor Lü Jia committed an regicidal coup in attempt to desinicize the kingdom, killing the fourth king Zhao Xing and his pro-Han mother Queen Dowager Jiu. In response, the Han court under Emperor Wu dispatched the a punitive campaign in 111 BCE, conquering and permanently absorbing the Lingnan region into the Han Emperor as part of its southward expansion.

The development of the region was boosted once the Mei Pass was paved during the Tang dynasty. The region was also the base of the Kingdom of Southern Han (917–971) during the chaotic Five Dynasties and Ten Kingdoms period between the fall of the Tang dynasty and the establishment of the Song dynasty.

== Lingnan Jiedushi ==
The Lingnan Jiedushi or military command was another name of the Jinghai Jiedushi during the Tang dynasty.

List of jiedushis:

- Song Jing 716
- Zhen Dan 717
- Pei Zhouxian 719-722
- Li Ju 727-735
- Li Shangyin 727
- Li Chaoyin 733-735
- Song Ding 739
- Pei Dunfu 745
- Peng Guo 745-747
- Lu Huan 749-751
- Zhang Jiugao 751-753
- A Lüguang 754-756
- Helan Jinming 756
- Wei Lijian 757-758
- Zhang Wanqing 758-760
- Zhao Liangbi 760-761
- Zhang Xiu 763
- Yang Shenwei 764-767
- Xu Hao 767-768
- Li Mian 768-772
- Li Chongben 772-773
- Lu Sigong 773
- Li Shu 775
- Gao Yun 776-777
- Zhang Boyi 777-782
- Yuan Xiu 782-784
- Du You 784-787
- Li Fu 787-792
- Xue Jue 792-795
- Wang E 795-801
- Zhao Zhi 801-802
- Xu Shen 802-806
- Zhao Chang 806-808
- Yang Yuling 808-810
- Zheng Yin 810-813
- Ma Zong 813-816
- Cui Yong 817
- Kong Kui 817-820
- Cui Neng 820-823
- Zheng Quan 823-824
- Cui Zhi 824-826
- Hu Zheng 826-828
- Li Xian 828-829
- Cui Hu 829-830
- Li Liang 831-833
- Cui Gong 833
- Wang Maoyuan 833-835
- Li Congyi 835-836
- Lu Jun 836-840
- Cui Guicong 844-845
- Lu Zhen 845-846
- Li Pin 847-848
- Li Xingxiu 848-849
- Wei Zhengguan 849-851
- Ge Ganzhong 851-854
- Wei Shu 855-858
- Yang Fa 858
- Li Sui 858
- Li Chengxun 858-859
- Xiao Fang 859-860
- Wei Zhou 861-868
- Zheng Yu 868-871
- Zheng Congdang 871-874
- Wei He 874-876
- Li Tiao 877-879
- Zheng Xu 879-886
- Lü Yongzhi 886
- Pei Qu 887-889
- Li Chonggui 890-895
- Chen Pei 893
- Cui Yin 896
- Li Zhirou 896-900
- Cui Yin 900
- Xu Yanruo 900-901
- Liu Yin 901-911
- Pei Shu 903
- Cui Yuan 904
- Liu Yan 911-917

== See also ==
- Jiangnan
- Lingnan culture
- Liangguang
- Tĩnh Hải quân
