= Lu Jia =

Lu Jia may refer to:

- Lu Jia (Western Han) (陸賈; Lù Jiǎ; d. 170 BCE), Western Han official
- Lü Jia (prince of Lü) (呂嘉; Lǚ Jiā), the second prince of Lü.
- Lü Jia (Nanyue) or Lữ Gia (died 110 BC), Prime Minister of Nanyue
- Jia Lu (呂嘉, born 1954), Chinese painter
- Lü Jia (conductor) (呂嘉, born 1964), Chinese conductor
