= 182 =

182 may also refer to:

- 182 (number)
- 182 BC
- AD 182
- 182 (New Jersey bus)
- Interstate 182, an east–west auxiliary Interstate Highway in the U.S. state of Washington
- UFC 182, a mixed martial arts event held by the Ultimate Fighting Championship
- 182 Elsa, a Massalia or background asteroid from the inner regions of the asteroid belt
- Paragraph 182, a 1927 German silent drama film
- Radical 182, one of the 11 Kangxi radicals composed of 9 strokes meaning "wind"
- Alfa Romeo 182, a Formula One racing car

== See also ==
- Flight 182
