= 114 BC =

114 BC in various calendars
- Gregorian calendar: 114 BC; CXIV BC
- Ab urbe condita: 640
- Ancient Egypt era: XXXIII dynasty, 210
- Pharaoh: Ptolemy IX Lathyros, 3
- Ancient Greek Olympiad (summer): 166th Olympiad, year 3
- Assyrian calendar: 4637
- Balinese saka calendar: N/A
- Bengali calendar: −707 – −706
- Berber calendar: 837
- Buddhist calendar: 431
- Burmese calendar: −751
- Byzantine calendar: 5395–5396
- Chinese calendar: 丙寅年 (Fire Tiger); 2584 or 2377 — to — 丁卯年 (Fire Rabbit); 2585 or 2378
- Coptic calendar: −397 – −396
- Discordian calendar: 1053
- Ethiopian calendar: −121 – −120
- Hebrew calendar: 3647–3648
- Hindu calendars
- Vikram Samvat: −57 – −56
- Shaka Samvat: N/A
- Kali Yuga: 2987–2988
- Holocene calendar: 9887
- Iranian calendar: 735 BP – 734 BP
- Islamic calendar: 758 BH – 757 BH
- Javanese calendar: N/A
- Julian calendar: N/A
- Korean calendar: 2220
- Minguo calendar: 2025 before ROC 民前2025年
- Nanakshahi calendar: −1581
- Seleucid era: 198/199 AG
- Thai solar calendar: 429–430
- Tibetan calendar: མེ་ཕོ་སྟག་ལོ་ (male Fire-Tiger); 13 or −368 or −1140 — to — མེ་མོ་ཡོས་ལོ་ (female Fire-Hare); 14 or −367 or −1139

Year 114 BC was a year of the pre-Julian Roman calendar. At the time it was known as the Year of the Consulship of Balbus and Cato (or, less frequently, year 640 Ab urbe condita) and the Third Year of Yuanding. The denomination 114 BC for this year has been used since the early medieval period, when the Anno Domini calendar era became the prevalent method in Europe for naming years.

== Events ==
- The Scordisci defeat Gaius Porcius Cato
- Horos, son of Haruotes, a resident of the temple of Isis in Egypt, attacked a worshiper at the temple.
- Silk Road routes opened to traders and merchants, exporting goods from east to west.

== Births ==
- Lucius Orbilius Pupillus, Roman grammarian and writer
- Publius Cornelius Lentulus Sura, Roman consul (d. 63 BC)
- Quintus Hortensius, Roman consul and orator (d. 50 BC)

== Deaths ==
- Zhang Qian, Chinese explorer and diplomat (b. 195 BC)
