= Zhao Jiande =

King Yang of Nanyue Triệu Dương Vương 趙陽王
- King of Nanyue

King of Nanyue
- Reign: 112–111 BC
- Predecessor: Zhao Xing (Triệu Ai Vương)
- Successor: None (Dynasty disestablished)
- Died: 111 BC
Names
- Chinese: 趙建德; pinyin: Zhào Jiàndé; Vietnamese: Triệu Kiến Đức
Posthumous name
- Chinese: 趙陽王; pinyin: Zhào Yáng Wáng; Vietnamese: Triệu Dương Vương
- House: Zhao (Triệu)
- Dynasty: Nanyue
- Father: Zhao Yingqi

Zhao Jiande (Chinese: 趙建德; pinyin: Zhào Jiàndé; Jyutping: Ziu^{6} Gin^{3} Dak^{1}, Vietnamese: Triệu Kiến Đức, ?–111 BC) was the last king of Nanyue. His rule began in 112 BC and ended in the next year. He was executed by Western Han forces during the reign of Emperor Wu of Han.

== Early life ==
Zhao Jiande was the eldest son of Zhao Yingqi and a Yue woman. Although the eldest, Jiande was passed over for kingship in preference for his half-brother, Zhao Xing.

== War with the Han ==
During Zhao Xing's reign, Emperor Wu of Han sent missions to Nanyue to summon Zhao Xing to the Han court for an audience with the emperor. Zhao Xing and his mother decided to submit to the Han, but the prime minister Lü Jia (呂嘉), who held military power in Nanyue at that time, opposed this. Emperor Wu dispatched Han Qianqiu (韓千秋) with 2000 soldiers to arrest Lü Jia. After hearing of these developments, Lü Jia conducted a coup d'état, killing Zhao Xing and all of his supporters in 112 BC. Zhao Jiande was then crowned king of Nanyue.

The 2000 men led by Han Qianqiu defeated several small towns but were defeated as they neared Panyu, which greatly shocked and angered Emperor Wu. The emperor then sent an army of 100,000 to attack Nanyue. The army marched on Panyu in a multi-pronged assault. Lu Bode advanced from the Hui River and Yang Pu from the Hengpu River. Three natives of Nanyue also joined the Han. One advanced from the Li River, the second invaded Cangwu, and the third advanced from the Zangke River.

In the winter of 111 BC Yang Pu captured Xunxia and broke through the line at Shimen. With 20,000 men he drove back the vanguard of the Nanyue army and waited for Lu Bode. However Lu failed to meet up on time and when he did arrive, he had no more than a thousand men. Yang reached Panyu first and attacked it at night, setting fire to the city. Panyu surrendered at dawn. Zhao Jiande and Lü Jia fled the city by boat, heading east to appeal for Minyue's aid, but the Han learned of their escape and sent the general Sima Shuang after them. Both Zhao Jiande and Lü Jia were captured and executed.

== Aftermath ==
When the neighboring kingdoms of Cangwu, Xiou (Western Ou), and Luoluo heard of the fall of Nanyue, they all submitted to the Han. Their kings were made marquises.

== Legacy ==
Based on many temples of Lü Jia (Lữ Gia), his wives, and soldiers scattering in Red River Delta of northern Vietnam, the war might have lasted until 98 BC.

After the fall of Panyu, Tây Vu Vương (the captain of Tây Vu area of which the center is Cổ Loa) revolted against the First Chinese domination from Western Han dynasty. He was killed by his assistant Hoàng Đồng (黄同).

Neither Shiji nor Hanshu had mentioned his Temple name, but his Posthumous name was mentioned in some Vietnamese historical texts. He was called Dương Vương (陽王 Yáng Wáng) in Việt Nam sử lược, Thuật Dương Vương (術陽王 Shù Yáng Wáng) in Đại Việt sử ký toàn thư, and Vệ Dương vương (衛陽王 Wèi Yáng Wáng) in Đại Việt sử lược.

His palace supposedly formed the grounds of Guangzhou's Guangxiao Temple.

== See also ==
- Triệu Anh Tề
- Triệu Hưng
- Phiên Ngung
- Guangxiao Temple (Guangzhou)

== Bibliography ==
- Taylor, Jay (1983), The Birth of the Vietnamese, University of California Press
- Watson, Burton (1993), Records of the Grand Historian by Sima Qian: Han Dynasty II (Revised Edition, Columbia University Press

Zhao Jiande/ Triệu Dương Vương Triệu dynasty Died: 111 BC
Regnal titles
Preceded by Zhào Xīng (Ai Vương)	King of Nanyue; 112–111 BC	Position abolished Nanyue Kingdom annexed by the Han dynasty
