= Zhao Yingqi =

King Ming of Nanyue Triệu Minh Vương 趙明王
- King of Nanyue

King of Nanyue
- Reign: 122–115 BC
- Predecessor: Zhao Mo (Triệu Văn Đế)
- Successor: Zhao Xing (Triệu Ai Vương)
- Died: 115 BC
Names
- Chinese: 趙嬰齊; pinyin: Zhào Yīngqí; Vietnamese: Triệu Anh Tề
Posthumous name
- Chinese: 趙明王; pinyin: Zhào Míng Wáng; Vietnamese: Triệu Minh Vương
- House: Zhao (Triệu)
- Dynasty: Nanyue
- Father: Zhao Mo

Zhao Yingqi (Chinese: 趙嬰齊; pinyin: Zhào Yīngqí; Jyutping: Ziu^{6} Jing^{1} Cai^{4}; Vietnamese: Triệu Anh Tề, ? – 115 BC) was the son of Zhao Mo and the third ruler of the kingdom of Nanyue. His rule began in 122 BC and ended with his death in 115 BC.

After the Western Han dynasty aided Nanyue in fending off an invasion by Minyue, Zhao Mo sent his son Yingqi to the Western Han court, where he joined the emperor's guard (宿衛, Sù wèi). Zhao Yingqi married an ethnic Han woman from the Jiu (樛) family of Handan, who gave birth to his second son, Zhao Xing.

Zhao Yingqi behaved without any scruples and committed murder on several occasions. When his father died in 122 BC, he refused to visit the Han emperor to ask for his leave as he feared that he would be arrested and punished for his behavior. Yingqi died in 115 BC and was succeeded by his second son, Zhao Xing (under the regency of his mother), rather than the eldest, Zhao Jiande. Zhao Xing was eventually overthrown and killed by Han forces.

== See also ==
- Triệu dynasty
- Nanyue
- Zhao Mo
- Zhao Xing
- Zhao Jiande
- Panyu District
- Lü Jia (Nanyue)
- Museum of the Mausoleum of the Nanyue King
- Baiyue

== Bibliography ==
- Amies, Alex; Ban, Gu (2020). Hanshu Volume 95 The Southwest Peoples, Two Yues, and Chaoxian: Translation with Commentary. Gutenberg Self Publishing Press. ISBN 978-0-9833348-7-3.
- Taylor, Jay (1983), The Birth of the Vietnamese, University of California Press
- Watson, Burton (1993), Records of the Grand Historian by Sima Qian: Han Dynasty II (Revised Edition, Columbia University Press

== Primary sources ==
- Shiji, vol. 113.
- Book of Han, vol. 95.
- Đại Việt sử ký toàn thư, vol.2 (Kỳ Triệu)

Zhao Yingqi/ Triệu Minh Vương Triệu dynasty Died: 115 BC
Regnal titles
Preceded by Zhào Mò (Văn Đế)	King of Nanyue; 122 BC – 115 BC	Succeeded by Zhào Xīng (Ai Vương)
