= Jia Lu =

American painter

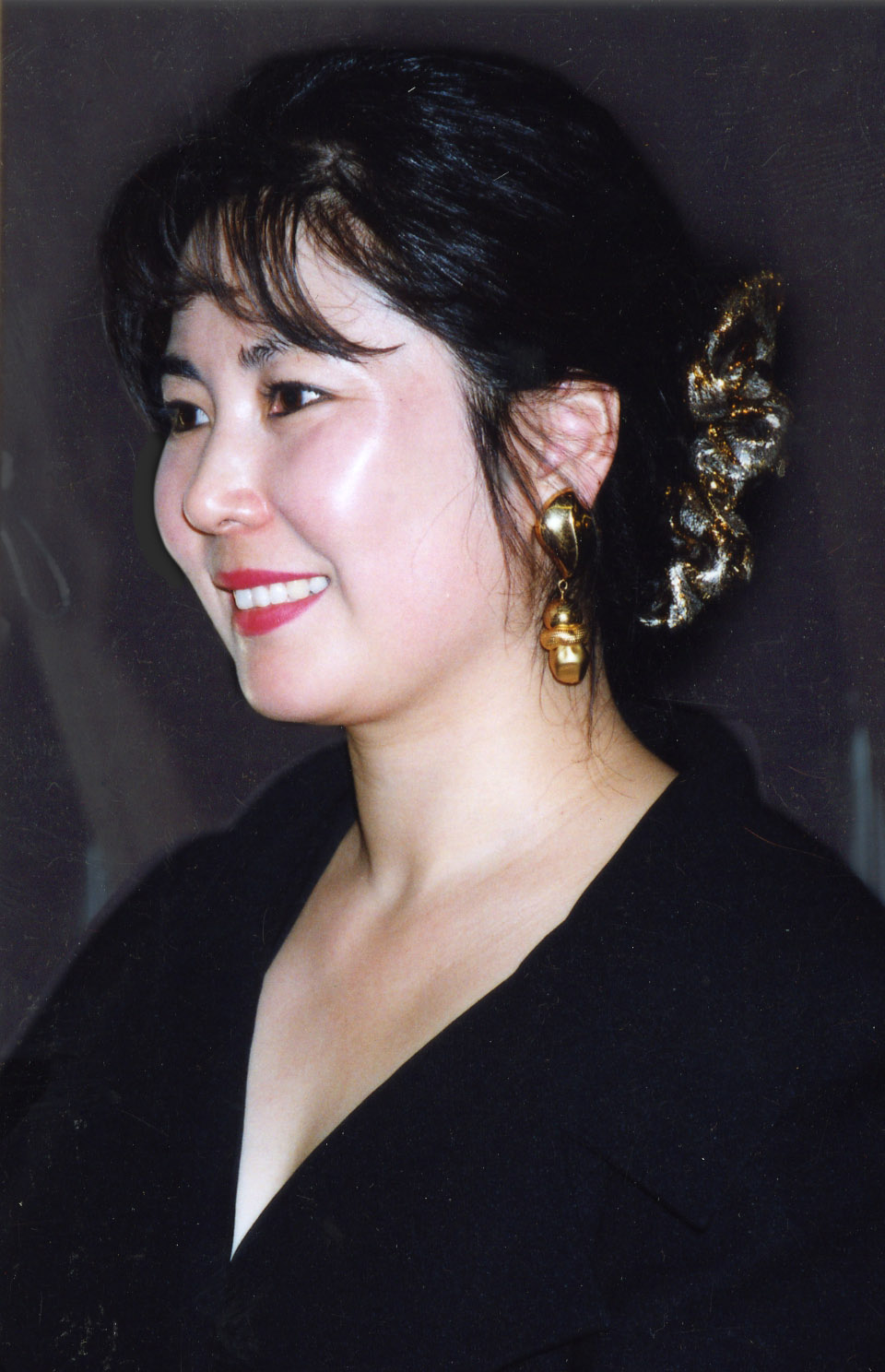
Jia Lu

Jia Lu (Chinese: 吕嘉; pinyin: Lǚ Jiā) is an oil painter working in America, known for blending Asian and European imagery in her paintings, predominantly of women.

== Biography ==
Jia Lu was born in 1954 in Beijing and is the daughter of Chinese oil painter Lu Enyi (吕恩谊). While living in China, Jia Lu worked as an operating room nurse, an actress and magazine editor. In 1980 she was admitted to the Central Academy of Arts and Design (中央工艺美术学院), now part of Tsinghua University and studied under Fan Zeng, graduating in 1983.

== Career ==
In 1983, Jia Lu left China to study art in Canada, first at the Toronto School of Art and later as a graduate student at York University Faculty of Visual Arts. She was elected to the Ontario China Artists Association. Her first major solo exhibition was at the Sarnia Public Art Gallery in 1989 and at the Edmonton Art Gallery (now the Art Gallery of Alberta) in 1994. From 1983 to 1995 she worked primarily in Chinese ink and mixed media, and exhibited her work in commercial galleries in Ontario and Alberta. Jia Lu worked from 1990 to 1993 in Japan and China, where she conducted extensive research into the Chinese figurative art preserved at the Mogao Caves in Dunhuang and is credited with the design of the "World's Largest Buddhist Mural" measuring 700 sq m.

In 1995, after travel in Europe, Jia Lu changed her medium to oil on canvas, and began to create realistic figurative work.

In 1997 Jia Lu moved to Los Angeles where she continues to live and work. From 1997 to 2007 she exhibited annually at International Art Expo and in galleries throughout the United States and Canada. In 1999 she was invited as one of three artist to represent China and exhibited 15 paintings at the UNESCO China Culture Week in Paris. In 2000, she was the first Chinese woman to hold a solo exhibition at the UN Headquarters in New York. Her limited edition print “Armillary Sphere” was selected among the top 5 prints of 2000 by U.S. Art Magazine. She was given the key to the city of San Diego as an honorary citizen the same year. In 2002 she exhibited her work at the Pacific Asia Museum in Pasadena, and designed the "Goddess of Life" Chinese Memorial statue erected at the Guam International Airport, based on her painting "Flame". In 2009 she returned to China to participate in the Shanghai International Art Fair and Fine Art Beijing and in 2010 at the CIGE and Art Beijing fairs, and was the subject of a two-hour documentary on CCTV-9. In 2011 she was chosen among the top 50 most-recognized Chinese in the world by The Global Times.

== Work ==
Jia Lu's works include Chinese ink paintings, oil paintings, watercolors, drawings, sculpture and prints. Her early work strongly reflected the traditional aesthetics of her teacher Fan Zeng, but by the time she exhibited in Canada, she was critiquing new social developments, consumerism and power relations in China through a series of mixed-media self-portraits. Her mature work in oils demonstrates an interest in Buddhism and a purely feminine aesthetic, and can be seen as a response to the masculine, sensual approach to the female nude. However, she has also painted male figures. In numerous interviews she has emphasized the importance of beauty in her work, which she describes as "strength and wisdom."
