= Flight 182 =

Flight 182 may refer to:

Listed chronologically

- American Airlines Flight 182, narrowly avoided a mid-air collision over Michigan on 26 November 1975
- Pacific Southwest Airlines Flight 182, crashed after colliding with a private plane over San Diego on 25 September 1978
- Air India Flight 182, exploded by a terrorist bombing off the coast of Ireland on 23 June 1985
- Sriwijaya Air Flight 182, crashed in the Java Sea on 9 January 2021
