= 50 BC =

50 BC in various calendars
- Gregorian calendar: 50 BC; L BC
- Ab urbe condita: 704
- Ancient Egypt era: XXXIII dynasty, 274
- Pharaoh: Cleopatra VII, 2
- Ancient Greek Olympiad (summer): 182nd Olympiad, year 3
- Assyrian calendar: 4701
- Balinese saka calendar: N/A
- Bengali calendar: −643 – −642
- Berber calendar: 901
- Buddhist calendar: 495
- Burmese calendar: −687
- Byzantine calendar: 5459–5460
- Chinese calendar: 庚午年 (Metal Horse); 2648 or 2441 — to — 辛未年 (Metal Goat); 2649 or 2442
- Coptic calendar: −333 – −332
- Discordian calendar: 1117
- Ethiopian calendar: −57 – −56
- Hebrew calendar: 3711–3712
- Hindu calendars
- Vikram Samvat: 7–8
- Shaka Samvat: N/A
- Kali Yuga: 3051–3052
- Holocene calendar: 9951
- Iranian calendar: 671 BP – 670 BP
- Islamic calendar: 692 BH – 691 BH
- Javanese calendar: N/A
- Julian calendar: N/A
- Korean calendar: 2284
- Minguo calendar: 1961 before ROC 民前1961年
- Nanakshahi calendar: −1517
- Seleucid era: 262/263 AG
- Thai solar calendar: 493–494
- Tibetan calendar: ལྕགས་ཕོ་རྟ་ལོ་ (male Iron-Horse); 77 or −304 or −1076 — to — ལྕགས་མོ་ལུག་ལོ་ (female Iron-Sheep); 78 or −303 or −1075

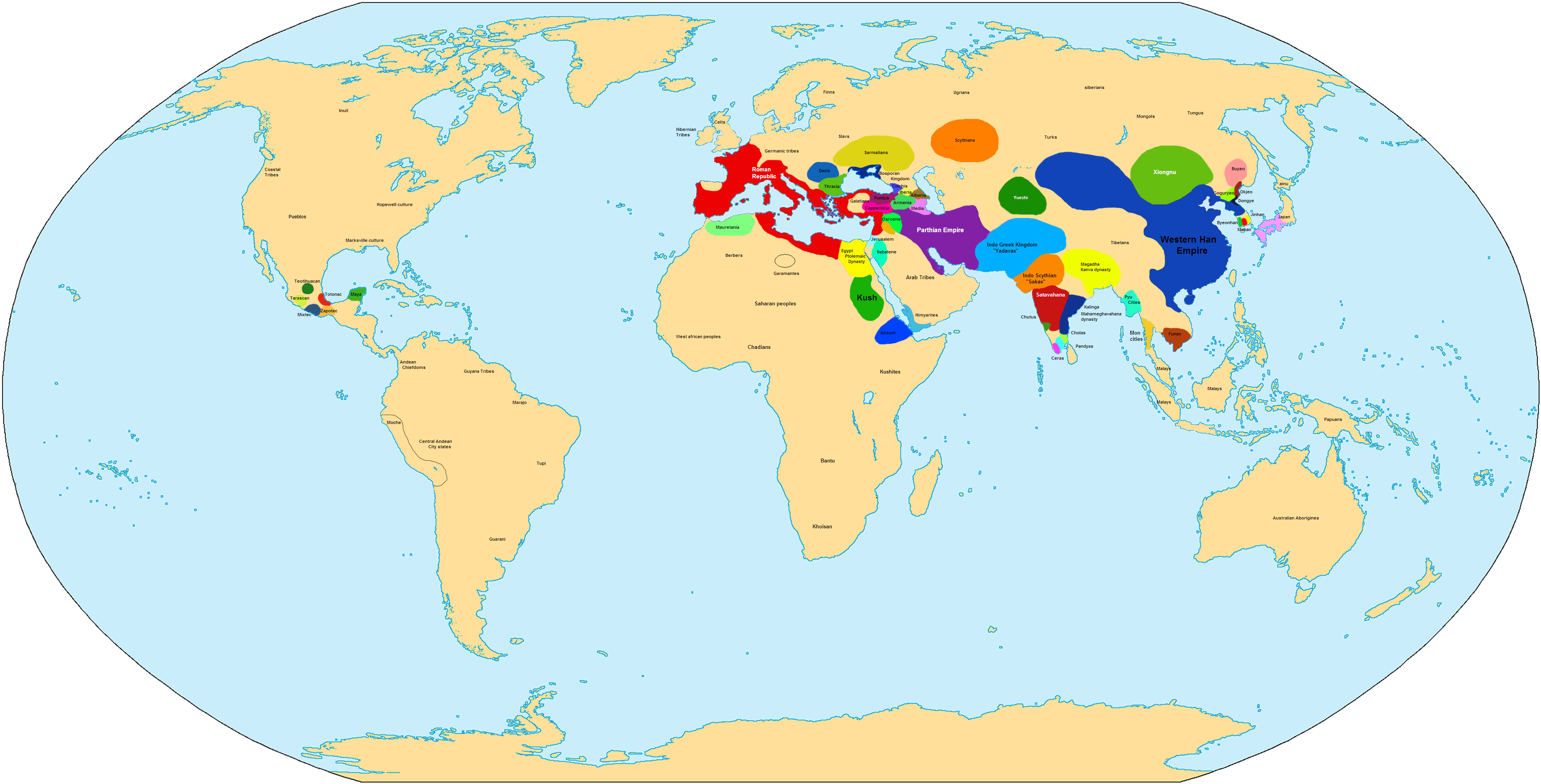
Map of the world in 50 BC

Year 50 BC was a year of the pre-Julian Roman calendar. At the time, it was known as the Year of the Consulship of Paullus and Marcellus (or, less frequently, year 704 Ab urbe condita). The denomination 50 BC for this year has been used since the early medieval period, when the Anno Domini calendar era became the prevalent method in Europe for naming years.

In 50 BC, the Roman Republic experienced growing political instability as disagreements between Julius Caesar and leading members of the Senate intensified. Caesar's continued command over his armies in Gaul became a major source of controversy, with his opponents seeking to establish a date for the termination of his military authority.

Gaius Scribonius Curio, a Roman tribune, became an important political figure during the year. Although previously associated with Caesar's opponents, Curio increasingly supported Caesar. He proposed that both Caesar and Pompey should surrender their military commands simultaneously, arguing that neither should retain an unfair political or military advantage.

During the summer of 50 BC, Pompey became seriously ill while staying at Neapolis, in southern Italy. His illness reportedly caused concern throughout Italy, and public sacrifices were offered for his recovery. He eventually recovered and continued to participate in Roman political affairs.

The Roman Senate requested that Julius Caesar and Pompey each provide a legion for the defence of Syria against the Parthian Empire. The troops were intended to strengthen Roman military resources in the eastern provinces. However, the legions ultimately remained in Italy under Pompey's control, further increasing political tensions.

In Gaul, Caesar continued overseeing his military forces and provincial administration. He visited Cisalpine Gaul and reviewed his troops in the territory of the Treveri. Later in the year, his legions were distributed into winter quarters among the Aedui and Belgae.

Cicero, one of Rome's most influential statesmen and orators, returned to Italy after serving as governor of Cilicia. During the year, his daughter Tullia married Publius Cornelius Dolabella. Another prominent Roman orator, Quintus Hortensius Hortalus, died in 50 BC. His death was later discussed by Cicero in his philosophical and literary writings.

On 1 December 50 BC, a large majority of the Roman Senate supported Curio's proposal that both Caesar and Pompey should relinquish their military commands. However, the political disagreement remained unresolved. The following day, the consuls authorized Pompey to undertake the defence of Italy against Caesar, without obtaining the formal agreement of the Senate.

By the end of 50 BC, relations between Caesar and Pompey had deteriorated considerably. Political negotiations had failed to produce a lasting agreement, and both sides increasingly prepared for confrontation. These developments directly preceded the outbreak of the Roman Civil War in 49 BC, when Caesar crossed the Rubicon River with his army.

== Events ==
=== By place ===
==== Roman Republic ====
- Consuls: Lucius Aemilius Paullus and Gaius Claudius Marcellus.
- The Senate recalls Julius Caesar and rescinds his authority. Caesar breaks alliance with Pompey.
- The Roman artillery piece called Scorpio is invented.
- Initiation Rites of the Cult of Bacchus, detail of a wall painting in the Villa of the Mysteries, Pompeii, is made (approximate date).
- The Roman Republic takes control of Judea (approximate date).

== Births ==
- Antonia, daughter of Mark Antony
- Gaius Antistius Vetus, Roman consul (d. 1 AD)
- Shammai, Jewish scholar and rabbi (d. 30 AD)

== Deaths ==
- Aristobulus II, king of Judea
- Quintus Hortensius, Roman orator and advocate (b. 114 BC)

== In fiction ==
- The Asterix comic books are all set around this year.
