= 116 BC =

116 BC in various calendars
- Gregorian calendar: 116 BC; CXVI BC
- Ab urbe condita: 638
- Ancient Egypt era: XXXIII dynasty, 208
- Pharaoh: Ptolemy IX Lathyros, 1
- Ancient Greek Olympiad (summer): 166th Olympiad (victor)¹
- Assyrian calendar: 4635
- Balinese saka calendar: N/A
- Bengali calendar: −709 – −708
- Berber calendar: 835
- Buddhist calendar: 429
- Burmese calendar: −753
- Byzantine calendar: 5393–5394
- Chinese calendar: 甲子年 (Wood Rat); 2582 or 2375 — to — 乙丑年 (Wood Ox); 2583 or 2376
- Coptic calendar: −399 – −398
- Discordian calendar: 1051
- Ethiopian calendar: −123 – −122
- Hebrew calendar: 3645–3646
- Hindu calendars
- Vikram Samvat: −59 – −58
- Shaka Samvat: N/A
- Kali Yuga: 2985–2986
- Holocene calendar: 9885
- Iranian calendar: 737 BP – 736 BP
- Islamic calendar: 760 BH – 759 BH
- Javanese calendar: N/A
- Julian calendar: N/A
- Korean calendar: 2218
- Minguo calendar: 2027 before ROC 民前2027年
- Nanakshahi calendar: −1583
- Seleucid era: 196/197 AG
- Thai solar calendar: 427–428
- Tibetan calendar: ཤིང་ཕོ་བྱི་བ་ལོ་ (male Wood-Rat); 11 or −370 or −1142 — to — ཤིང་མོ་གླང་ལོ་ (female Wood-Ox); 12 or −369 or −1141

Year 116 BC was a year of the pre-Julian Roman calendar. At the time it was known as the Year of the Consulship of Geta and Eburnus (or, less frequently, year 638 Ab urbe condita) and the First Year of Yuanding. The denomination 116 BC for this year has been used since the early medieval period, when the Anno Domini calendar era became the prevalent method in Europe for naming years.

== Events ==
=== By place ===
==== Egypt ====
- June 26 – At the death of Ptolemy VIII Physcon, Cleopatra III has chosen her younger son Ptolemy X Alexander as co-regent, but the Alexandrians force her to bring Ptolemy IX from Cyprus, of which he is governor.
- Ptolemy IX Philometor Soter II Lathyros becomes king of Egypt and claims the throne.

== Births ==
- Marcus Terentius Varro (a.k.a. "Varro"), Roman scholar and writer (d. 27 BC)

== Deaths ==
- June 26 – Ptolemy VIII Physcon, king (pharaoh) of Egypt (b. c. 182 BC)
- Cleopatra II, queen of Egypt (b. c. 185 BC)
- Zhang Tang, Chinese official and politician
