= 182 BC =

182 BC in various calendars
- Gregorian calendar: 182 BC; CLXXXII BC
- Ab urbe condita: 572
- Ancient Egypt era: XXXIII dynasty, 142
- Pharaoh: Ptolemy V Epiphanes, 22
- Ancient Greek Olympiad (summer): 149th Olympiad, year 3
- Assyrian calendar: 4569
- Balinese saka calendar: N/A
- Bengali calendar: −775 – −774
- Berber calendar: 769
- Buddhist calendar: 363
- Burmese calendar: −819
- Byzantine calendar: 5327–5328
- Chinese calendar: 戊午年 (Earth Horse); 2516 or 2309 — to — 己未年 (Earth Goat); 2517 or 2310
- Coptic calendar: −465 – −464
- Discordian calendar: 985
- Ethiopian calendar: −189 – −188
- Hebrew calendar: 3579–3580
- Hindu calendars
- Vikram Samvat: −125 – −124
- Shaka Samvat: N/A
- Kali Yuga: 2919–2920
- Holocene calendar: 9819
- Iranian calendar: 803 BP – 802 BP
- Islamic calendar: 828 BH – 827 BH
- Javanese calendar: N/A
- Julian calendar: N/A
- Korean calendar: 2152
- Minguo calendar: 2093 before ROC 民前2093年
- Nanakshahi calendar: −1649
- Seleucid era: 130/131 AG
- Thai solar calendar: 361–362
- Tibetan calendar: ས་ཕོ་རྟ་ལོ་ (male Earth-Horse) −55 or −436 or −1208 — to — ས་མོ་ལུག་ལོ་ (female Earth-Sheep) −54 or −435 or −1207

Year 182 BC was a year of the pre-Julian Roman calendar. At the time it was known as the Year of the Consulship of Tamphilus and Paullus (or, less frequently, year 572 Ab urbe condita). The denomination 182 BC for this year has been used since the early medieval period, when the Anno Domini calendar era became the prevalent method in Europe for naming years.

== Events ==
=== By place ===
==== Asia Minor ====
- The king of Bithynia, Prusias I Chlorus dies and is succeeded by his son, who rules as Prusias II.

== Births ==
- Ptolemy VIII Euergetes II, king of the Ptolemaic dynasty in Egypt (d. 116 BC)

== Deaths ==
- Prusias I Chlorus, king of Bithynia (b. c. 228 BC)
- Jin Xi a Han Chinese general under Emperor Liu Bang.
- Zhang Ao, Feudal lord of Han dynasty.
