= Zhao Xing =

King Ai of Nanyue Triệu Ai Vương 趙哀王
- King of Nanyue
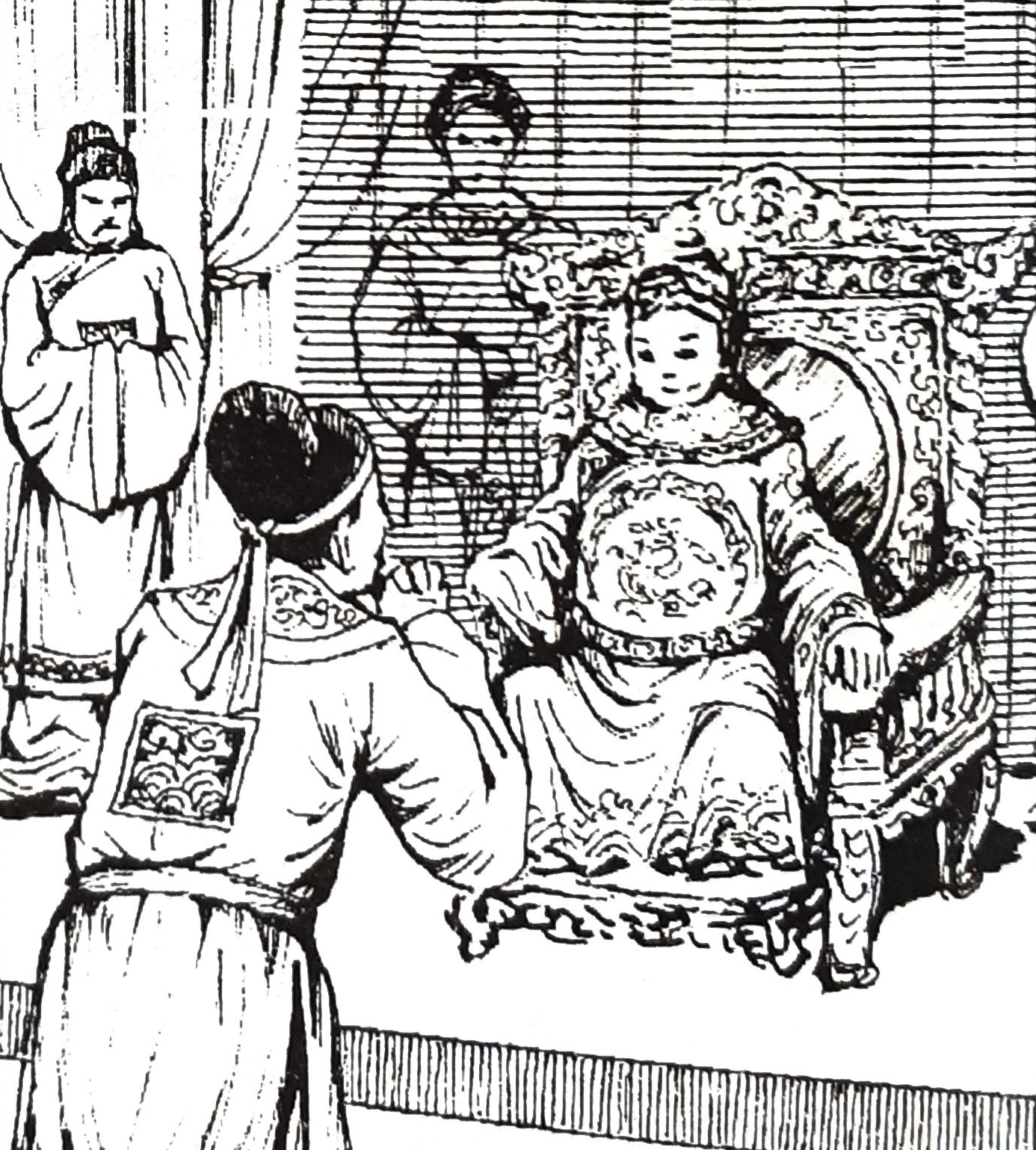
- Zhao Xing depicted in a Vietnamese comic

King of Nanyue
- Reign: 115–112 BC
- Predecessor: Zhao Yingqi (Triệu Minh Vương)
- Successor: Zhao Jiande (Triệu Dương Vương)
- Died: 112 BC
Names
- Chinese: 趙興; pinyin: Zhào Xīng; Vietnamese: Triệu Hưng
Posthumous name
- Chinese: 趙哀王; pinyin: Zhào Āi Wáng; Vietnamese: Triệu Ai Vương
- House: Zhao (Triệu)
- Dynasty: Nanyue
- Father: Zhao Yingqi
- Mother: Queen Jiu

Zhao Xing (Chinese: 趙興; pinyin: Zhào Xīng; Cantonese: Ziu^{6} Hing^{1}, Vietnamese: Triệu Hưng, ? – 112 BC), was the second son of Zhao Yingqi and the fourth ruler of Nanyue. His rule began in 115 BC and ended with his death in 112 BC, when he was overthrown and killed by Lü Jia.

== Life ==
In 113 BC, Emperor Wu of Han sent Anguo Shaoji (安國少季) to summon Zhao Xing and the Queen Dowager Jiu to Chang'an for an audience with the Emperor. The Queen Dowager Jiu, who was Han Chinese, was viewed in a hostile light by the Nanyue people, and it was widely rumored that she had an illicit relationship with Anguo Shaoji before she married Zhao Yingqi. When Anguo arrived, quite a number of people believed the two resumed their relationship. The Queen Dowager feared that there would be a revolt against her authority so she urged the king and his ministers to seek closer times to the Han. Zhao agreed and proposed that relations between Nanyue and the Han should be normalized with a triennial journey to the Han court as well as the removal of custom barriers along the border.

The prime minister Lü Jia (呂嘉) held military power, and his family was more well connected than either Zhao or Queen Jiu. According to the Shiji and Đại Việt sử ký toàn thư, Lü Jia was chief of a Lạc Việt tribe, related to King Qin of Cangwu by marriage, and over 70 of his kinsmen served as officials in various parts of the Nanyue court. Lü refused to meet the Han envoys which angered the Queen Dowager. She tried to kill him at a banquet but was stopped by Zhao. The Queen Dowager tried to gather enough support at court to kill Lü in the following months.

When news of the situation reached Emperor Wu of Han in 112 BC, he ordered Zhuang Can to lead a 2,000 men expedition to Nanyue. However Zhuang refused to accept the mission, declaring that it was illogical to send so many men under the pretext of peace, but so few to enforce the might of the Han. The former prime minister of Jibei, Han Qianqiu (韓千秋), offered to lead the expedition and arrest Lü Jia. When Han crossed the Han-Nanyue border, Lü conducted a coup, killing Zhao Xing, Queen Dowager Jiu and all the Han emissaries in the capital. Zhao Xing's brother, Zhao Jiande, was declared the new king.

The Temple name of Zhao Xing was not mentioned in both Shiji and Hanshu. But according to the Vietnamese historical text Đại Việt sử ký toàn thư, Zhao Xing's Posthumous name was Ai Vương (哀王, pinyin: Āi Wáng).

== See also ==
- Triệu dynasty
- Nanyue
- Zhao Yingqi
- Zhao Jiande
- Panyu District
- Lü Jia (Nanyue)

== Bibliography ==
- Taylor, Jay (1983), The Birth of the Vietnamese, University of California Press
- Watson, Burton (1993), Records of the Grand Historian by Sima Qian: Han Dynasty II (Revised Edition, Columbia University Press

Zhao Xing/ Triệu Ai Vương Triệu dynasty Died: 112 BC
Regnal titles
Preceded by Zhào Yīngqí (Minh Vương)	King of Nanyue; 115 BC – 112 BC	Succeeded by Zhào Jiàndé (Dương Vương)
