= Queen Jiu =

Queen Jiu or Cù Hậu (Chinese: 樛后; pinyin: Jiū Hòu; 2nd-century BC – 112 BC), was a queen consort and regent of Nanyue. She was originally from Handan (in modern Hebei). She was married to King Zhao Yingqi and was the mother of king Zhao Xing. She served as regent of Nanyue during the minority of her son between 113 and 112 BC. She and her son were deposed and murdered by prime minister Lü Jia for having submitted to the Han dynasty as vassals.
