= Lü Jia (Nanyue) =

Prime minister of Nanyue

Lü Jia (Lữ Gia)
- 呂嘉
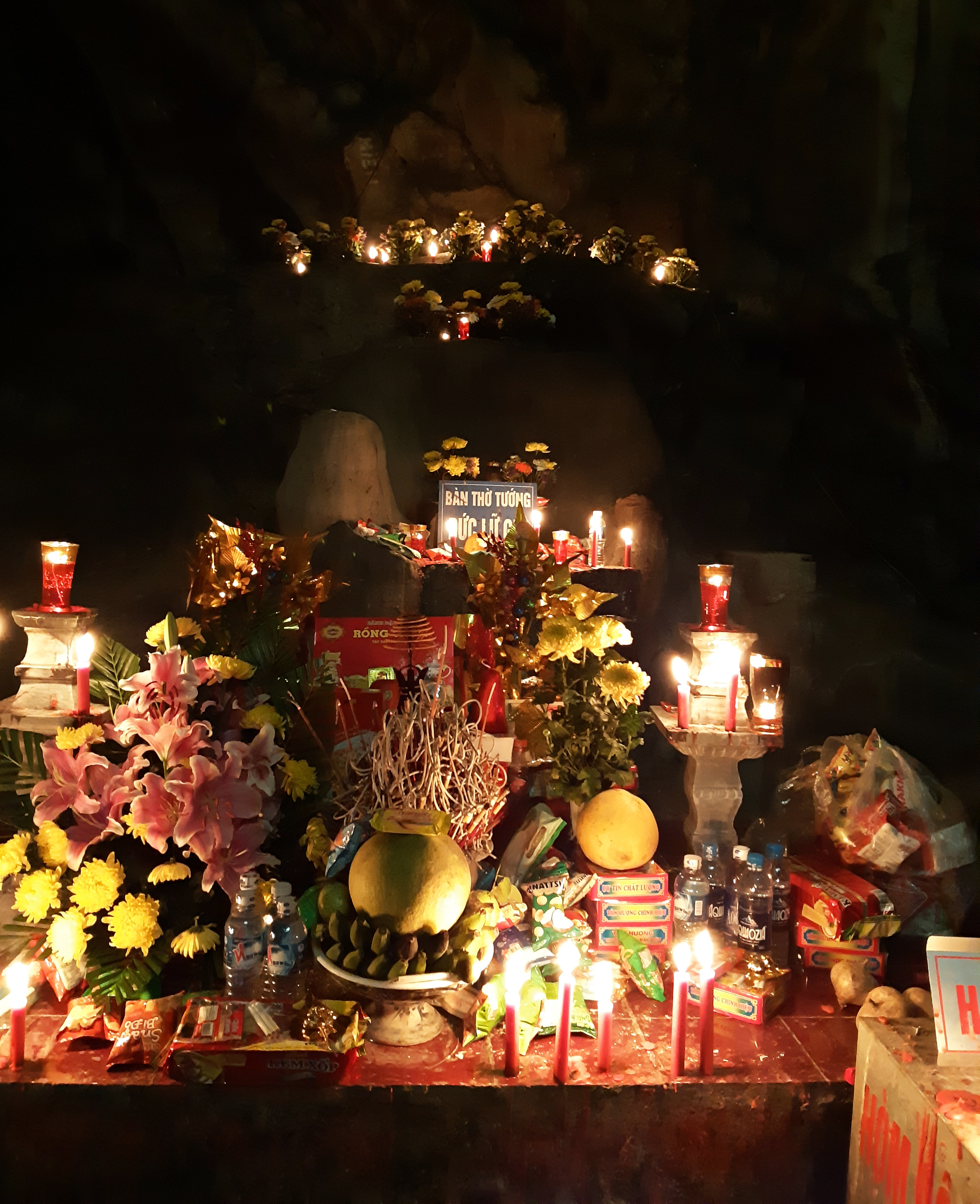
- Altar of Prime Minister Lü Jia inside Cắc Cớ Cave, Thầy Temple complex, Sài Sơn, Quốc Oai, Hanoi

Prime Minister of Nanyue
- Monarchs: Zhao Yingqi; Zhao Xing; Zhao Jiande

Personal details
- Born: 191 BC Unknown
- Died: 111 BC Nanyue
- Parent: Lữ Tạo (father)

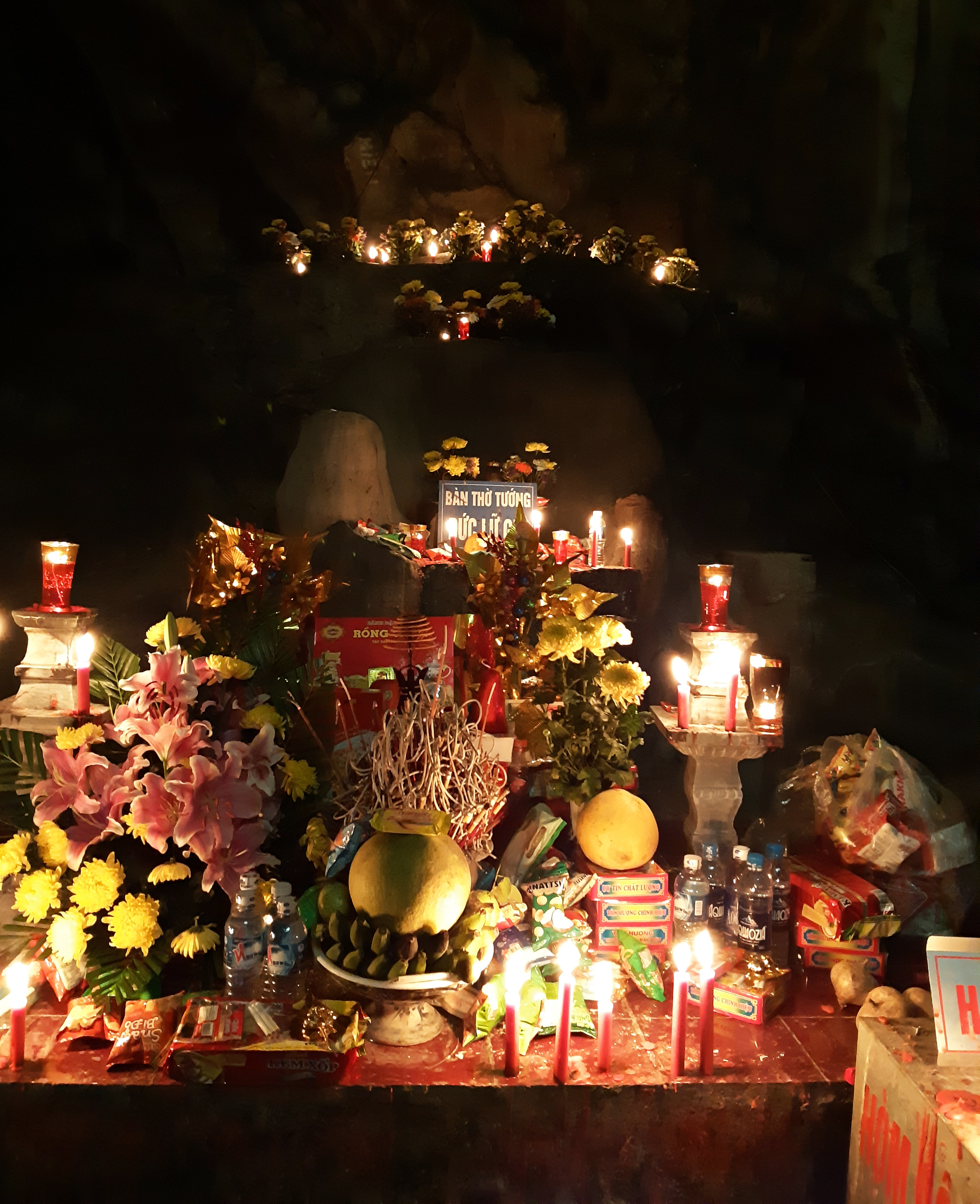
Altar of the Prime Minister Lữ Gia (Lü Jia) inside Cắc Cớ Cave, located at Thầy Temple site, Hanoi, Vietnam

Lü Jia (Chinese: 呂嘉; Wade–Giles: Lü Chia; Jyutping: Leoi5 Gaa1; died 111 BC), or Lữ Gia in Vietnamese, also called Bảo Công (保公), was the prime minister of Nanyue (Nam Việt) during the reigns of its three last kings (Zhao Yingqi, Zhao Xing and Zhao Jiande). Lü overthrew and killed Zhao Xing and Queen Jiu of Nanyue. Eventually Lü was killed and defeated by Han forces.

== Biography ==
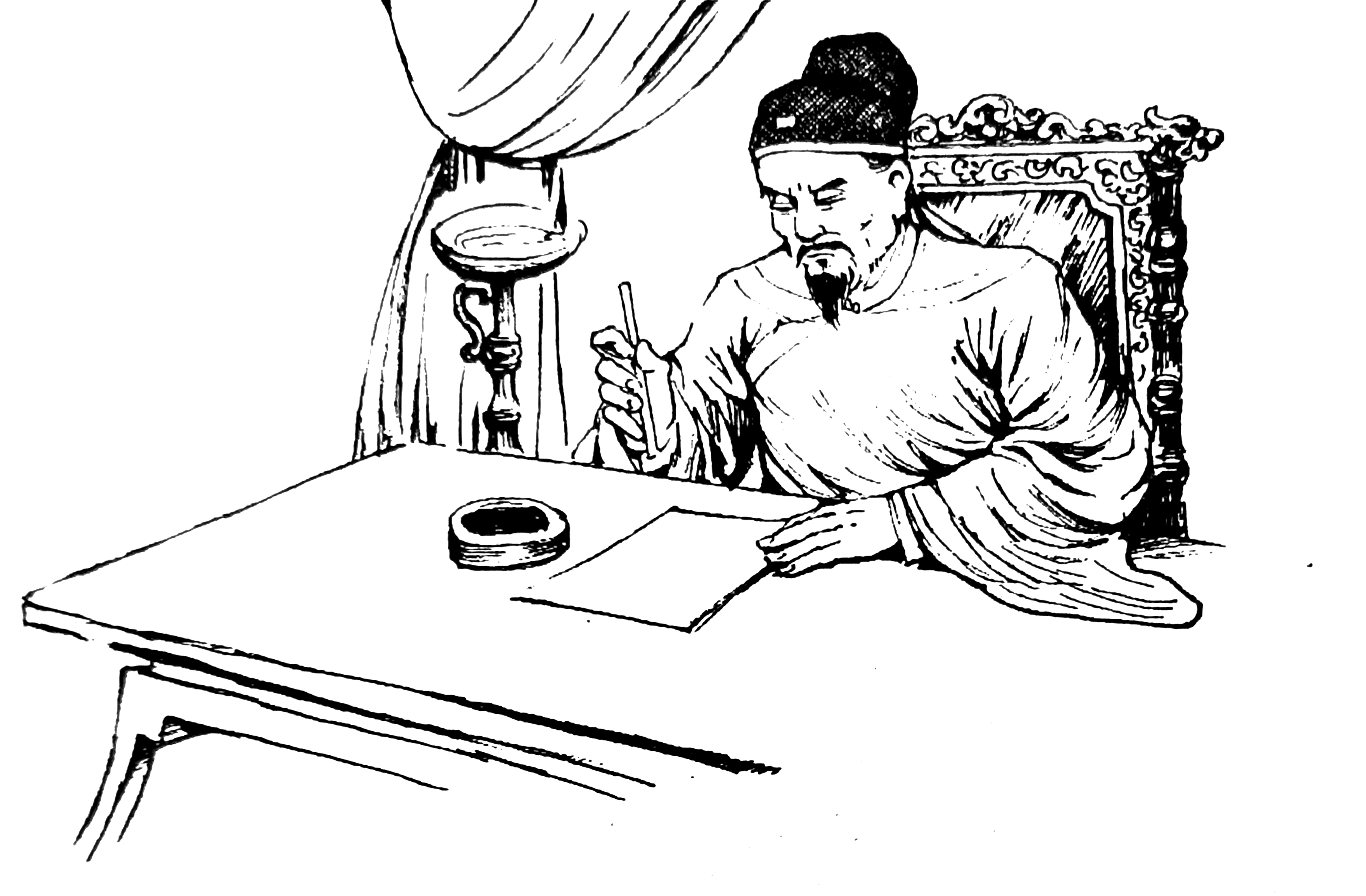
A painting of Lữ Gia in a truyện tranh series in Vietnam

The Shiji only mentions that Lü Jia served as prime minister during the reign of the three kings. Members of his clan often intermarried with the royal family, and over 70 of his kinsmen served as officials in various parts of the Nanyue government. Lü had high prestige in Nanyue and overshadowed the king. According to Vietnamese legend, he was a Lạc Việt chief born in Lôi Dương, Cửu Chân (modern Thọ Xuân District, Thanh Hóa Province, Vietnam).

In 113 BC, Emperor Wu of Han sent Anguo Shaoji (安國少季) to Nanyue to summon Zhao Xing and Queen Dowager Jiu to Chang'an for an audience. The Queen Dowager was a Han Chinese from Handan. Before she married Zhao Yingqi, she had an affair with Anguo Shaoji. Nanyue people did not trust Queen Jiu, and at the time, King Zhao Xing was young. Fearful of losing her position of authority, Queen Jiu decided to fully submit to the Han dynasty.

Lü and other ministers strongly opposed this, so Lü decided to revolt. He said he was ill and did not meet with the Han envoys. The Queen Dowager wanted to kill Lü, but was stopped by the Nanyue king. Lü gathered soldiers and planned to revolt. In 112 BC, Emperor Wu received information of the rebellion and dispatched Han Qianqiu (韓千秋) with 2000 soldiers to arrest Lü. During this time, Lü staged a coup and executed Queen Jiu and Zhao Xing. He crowned Prince Zhao Jiande as the new king and declared war on the Han dynasty.

In 111 BC, Han generals Lu Bode and Yang Pu attacked Nanyue and captured the capital Panyu (modern Guangzhou). Lü fled with Zhao Jiande, but was captured and executed.

Lü's tomb is in modern Ân Thi District, Hưng Yên Province, Vietnam where he is worshipped by local people together with his brother Lang Công.
