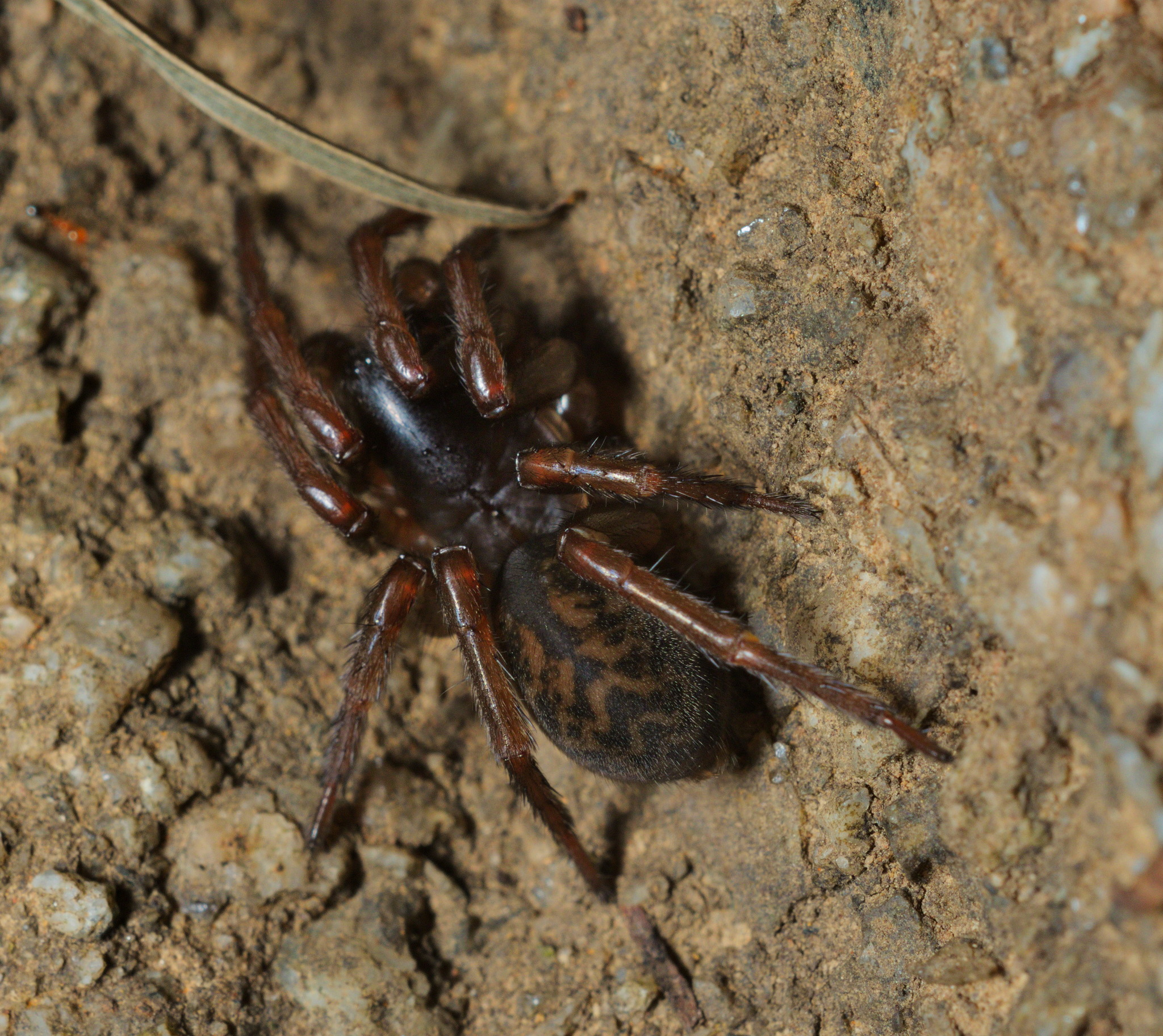
- B. shenzhen from Hong Kong

Scientific classification
- Kingdom: Animalia
- Phylum: Arthropoda
- Subphylum: Chelicerata
- Class: Arachnida
- Order: Araneae
- Infraorder: Araneomorphae
- Family: Agelenidae
- Subfamily: Coelotinae
- Genus: Baiyuerius; Zhao, B. Li & S. Li, 2023

Type species
- Baiyuerius zuojiang Zhao, B. Li & S. Li, 2023

Species
- See text

= Baiyuerius =

Genus of spiders

Baiyuerius is a genus of spiders in the family Agelenidae, subfamily Coelotinae. The genus was described in 2023 and contains 24 species distributed across southern China and northern Vietnam.

== Etymology ==
The generic name is derived from the pinyin word "Baiyue", referring to the Baiyue region where the genus is distributed. Baiyue was a term dating back to the first millennium BC, used to denote various populations who inhabited southern China and northern Vietnam. The postfix "-rius" refers to the postfix commonly used in the genera of the Sinodraconarius clade.

== Description ==
Medium-sized spiders with total lengths ranging from 8.60 to 11.98 mm. The cephalothorax is black turning brown or brown turning yellow-brown, pear-shaped, with longitudinal fovea and darker radial grooves. The chelicerae are the same color as the anterior carapace, with three promarginal and two retromarginal teeth. The endites and labium are dark brown or grey, anteriorly white with black hairs. The sternum is brown or milk-white, longer than wide. The opisthosoma is yellow-brown, covered with grey hairs, with two pairs of apodemes and four darker chevron-like markings.

The leg formula is 4123. In males, the pedipalp femur is more than three times longer than the patella, with the patella approximately half the length of the tibia. The patellar apophysis is thick and enlarged, finger-like, longer than half of the tibia and extending over the patella. The cymbial base is enlarged with one or two hypophyses, and the embolus is widened and slightly elongated, being widest anteriorly.

Females lack epigynal teeth. The atrium is located anteriorly, over the swell of the epigyne, internally milk-white, occupying more than or equal to one-quarter of the female epigyne. The spermathecae are small and located posteriorly, shorter than one-quarter the length of their copulatory ducts, with the anterior part fist-like and bases close to each other.

== Diagnosis ==
Baiyuerius can be distinguished from its closest relative, Yunguirius, by having an enlarged cymbial base with one or two hypophyses (versus no hypophyses in Yunguirius), an atrium located anteriorly and occupying less than or equal to half of the epigyne (versus centrally located and occupying more than half in Yunguirius), and simple spermathecae (versus spermathecal heads that are long and continuous with copulatory ducts in Yunguirius).

== Distribution ==
The genus is distributed across southern China and northern Vietnam, with species recorded from Guizhou and Guangdong provinces, Guangxi Zhuang Autonomous Region in China, and Vinh Phuc Province in Vietnam. Additional species have been described from Hubei, Hunan, and other provinces in China.

== Phylogeny ==
Molecular phylogenetic analyses strongly support Baiyuerius as a monophyletic clade and as a sister group to the genus Yunguirius. The divergence and formation of this genus is believed to be linked to geological and climatic events that occurred during the Neogene in Eurasia.

== Species ==
As of October 2026, the genus contains 24 species:

- Baiyuerius acroprocessus (Zhang, Zhu & Wang, 2017) – China
- Baiyuerius arcticus Wei & J. Liu, 2025 – China
- Baiyuerius carcharus Wei & J. Liu, 2025 – China
- Baiyuerius chongzu Wei & J. Liu, 2025 – China
- Baiyuerius cuii Wei & J. Liu, 2025 – China
- Baiyuerius daxi Zhao, B. Li & S. Li, 2023 – China
- Baiyuerius digitus Wei & J. Liu, 2025 – China
- Baiyuerius fengbini Wei & J. Liu, 2025 – China
- Baiyuerius globasus (Wang, Peng & Kim, 1996) – China
- Baiyuerius imitatus Wei & J. Liu, 2025 – China
- Baiyuerius jiquanyui Wei & J. Liu, 2025 – China
- Baiyuerius loong Wei & J. Liu, 2025 – China
- Baiyuerius pindong Zhao, B. Li & S. Li, 2023 – China
- Baiyuerius processus (Xu & Li, 2007) – China
- Baiyuerius rotulus (Liu, Li & Pham, 2010) – Vietnam
- Baiyuerius rugosus (Wang, Peng & Kim, 1996) – China
- Baiyuerius shaanensis Wei & J. Liu, 2025 – China
- Baiyuerius shenyunxiaoi Wei & J. Liu, 2025 – China
- Baiyuerius shenzhen Luo, Lu, Zhang & Wang, 2023 – China
- Baiyuerius subyanlingensis (Liu & Xu, 2020) – China
- Baiyuerius wenshanensis Wei & J. Liu, 2025 – China
- Baiyuerius yuelu Luo, Lu, Zhang & Wang, 2023 – China
- Baiyuerius zhuping Zhao, B. Li & S. Li, 2023 – China
- Baiyuerius zuojiang Zhao, B. Li & S. Li, 2023 – China (type species)
