= Yangyue =

Tribe of the Yue people

The Yangyue (Chinese: 揚越; pinyin: yángyuè) were a tribe of the Yue people, one of the ancient peoples that inhabited in what is now modern South China. According to Chinese historical and classical texts, the earliest description about the Yangyue appeared during the Warring States period. The commonly accepted hypothesis is that they were a tribe of the ancient Yue people who originally lived in the Yang Province (Yang Zhou), one of the ancient Nine Provinces (Jiu Zhou); because of this, the tribe was called “Yangyue”, meaning the Yue people from the Yang Province.

During the Warring States period, after the Yue Kingdom was destroyed, the Yangyue and the Baiyue grew in influence. Depending on the period, the term may not necessarily refer to the same group of people. The modern-day Zhejiang province is the core area of the ancient Yang Province, which also included the provinces of Fujian and Guangdong, the south of Jiangsu and Anhui, and the east of Jiangxi. Gradually, the Yue people spread to adjacent regions, into modern-day Jiangxi, the east and north of Hunan and the east of Hubei. The Yue people who settled there came to be known as the Yangyue.

The terrain within the regions inhabited by the Yangyue were dominated by mountains, hills, basins and river valleys. They were spread across the Yangtze River basin, including the Han, Xiang, Zi, Yuan, Li and Gan river valleys and the Dongting Lake and Poyang Lake basins. The Yangyue's lifestyle was based on agriculture, with rice being the most common crop.
