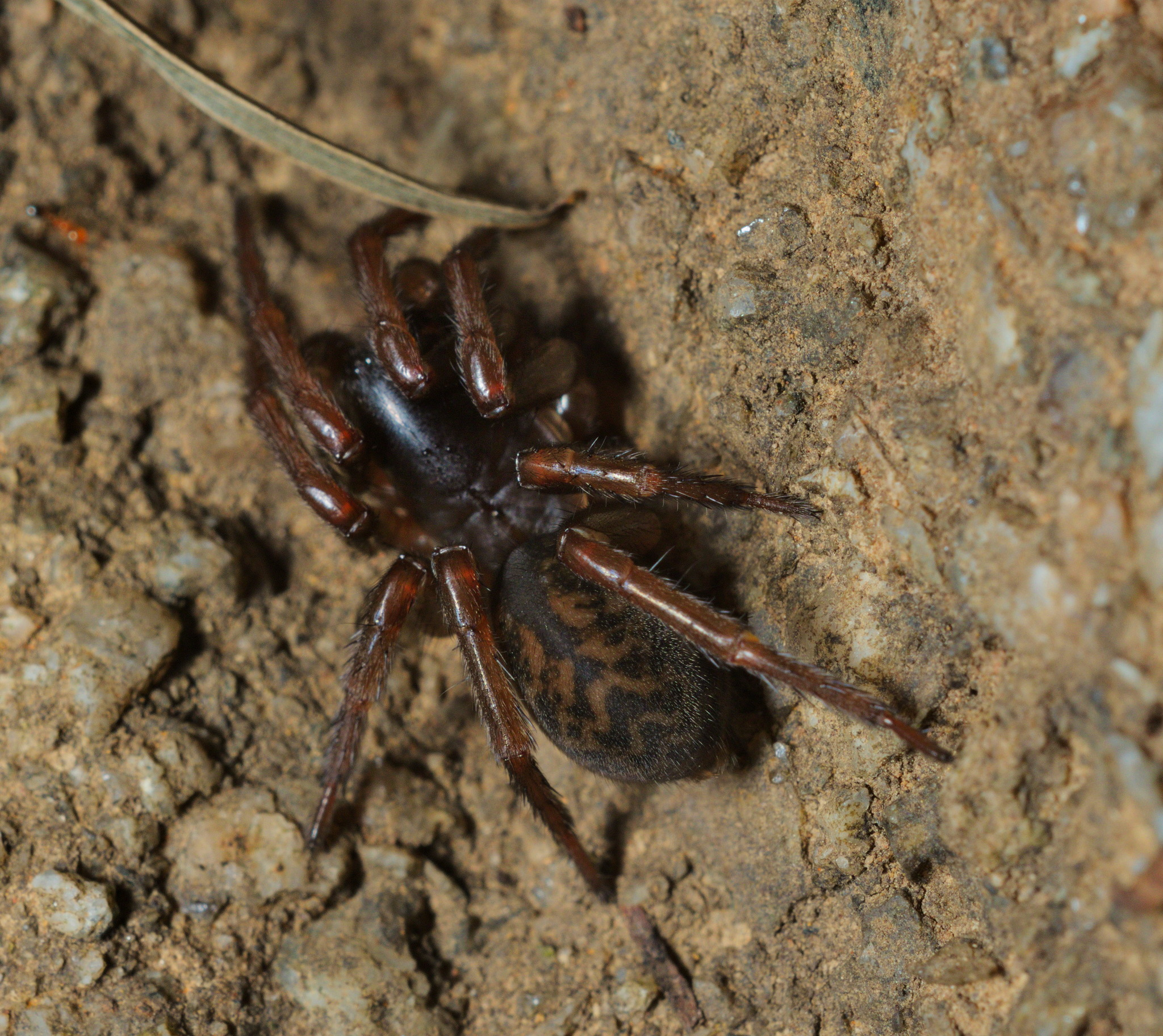
- specimen from Hong Kong

Scientific classification
- Kingdom: Animalia
- Phylum: Arthropoda
- Subphylum: Chelicerata
- Class: Arachnida
- Order: Araneae
- Infraorder: Araneomorphae
- Family: Agelenidae
- Genus: Baiyuerius
- Species: B. shenzhen

Binomial name
- Baiyuerius shenzhen Luo, Lu, Zhang & Wang, 2023

= Baiyuerius shenzhen =

Species of spider

Baiyuerius shenzhen is a species of spider in the family Agelenidae, subfamily Coelotinae. It is endemic to China. The species was described in 2023 and is known only from near its type locality in Shenzhen, Guangdong Province.

== Etymology ==
The specific name shenzhen refers to the type locality and is used as a noun in apposition.

== Distribution ==
B. shenzhen was described from the type locality at Wutong Mountain, Taishanjian, Fenglingjing in Shenzhen City, Guangdong Province, China, at an elevation of 205 metres.

== Description ==
The male holotype has a total length of 14.21 mm. The cephalothorax is 8.14 mm long and 5.46 mm wide, while the opisthosoma is 5.92 mm long and 4.47 mm wide. The carapace is brown with distinct cervical groove and radial furrows. The chelicerae are dark with three promarginal and two retromarginal teeth.

The female paratype has a total length of 17.67 mm. The cephalothorax is 7.86 mm long and 5.07 mm wide, while the opisthosoma is 9.45 mm long and 6.86 mm wide.

Males can be distinguished from the closely related species Baiyuerius zuojiang by the conductor having a smooth surface and flat margin, the cymbial base having two hypophyses (compared to one in B. zuojiang), and the patellar apophysis extending above two-thirds the length of the tibia. Females differ from B. zuojiang by having the copulatory opening positioned mid-ventrally in the atrium and highly convoluted spermathecae.
