= Hui River =

Hui River Huì River (濊水), Huan River (涣水) Baohui River (包浍河), Kuai River (浍水)
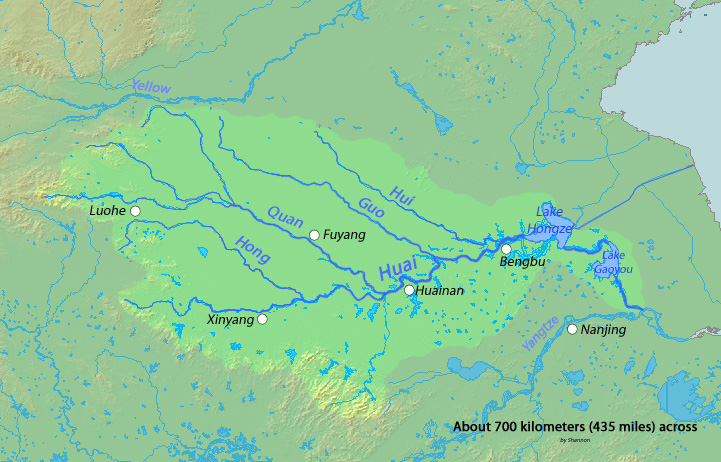
- Map showing the Hui River and Huai River
- Native name: 浍河 (Chinese)

Location
- Country: China
- Region: Northern China and Eastern China

Physical characteristics
- Source
  - location: Xiayi County, Henan province, China
- Mouth: Huai-Hong New Canal
  - location: Guzhen County, Anhui province, China
- Length: 131 mi (211 km), Northwest-Southeast
- Basin size: 1,872.6 sq mi (4,850 km^{2})

Basin features
- River system: Huai River watershed and Huai-Hong New Canal
- Tributaries
  - right: Bao River

Hui River (also pronounced as Kuai River), traditionally known as Huan River or Baohui River, was a major tributary of Huai River in northern China. Currently, it flows into the Huai-Hong New Canal , a constructed flood control waterway connecting Huaiyuan and Hongze Lake. The starting point of Hui River is the ancient Honggou Canal (鸿沟), which has a great historical significance because it was the border between territories controlled by Liu Bang and Xiang Yu during the Chu-Han Contention (206 - 202 BCE). The river is mainly recharged by rainwater and groundwater. The river is heavily polluted by wastewater from nearby towns.
