= Yugan =

Yugan may refer to:

- Yugan County, in Shangrao, Jiangxi, China
- Yugan dialect, dialect of the Gan language. It is spoken in Yugan County, Jiangxi
- Yugan (settlement), a settlement in the Republic of Tatarstan, Russia
- 10016 Yugan, an asteroid discovered by Lyudmila Zhuravlyova
