= Nanyue King Museum =

Museum in Guangzhou, China

- 南越王博物院
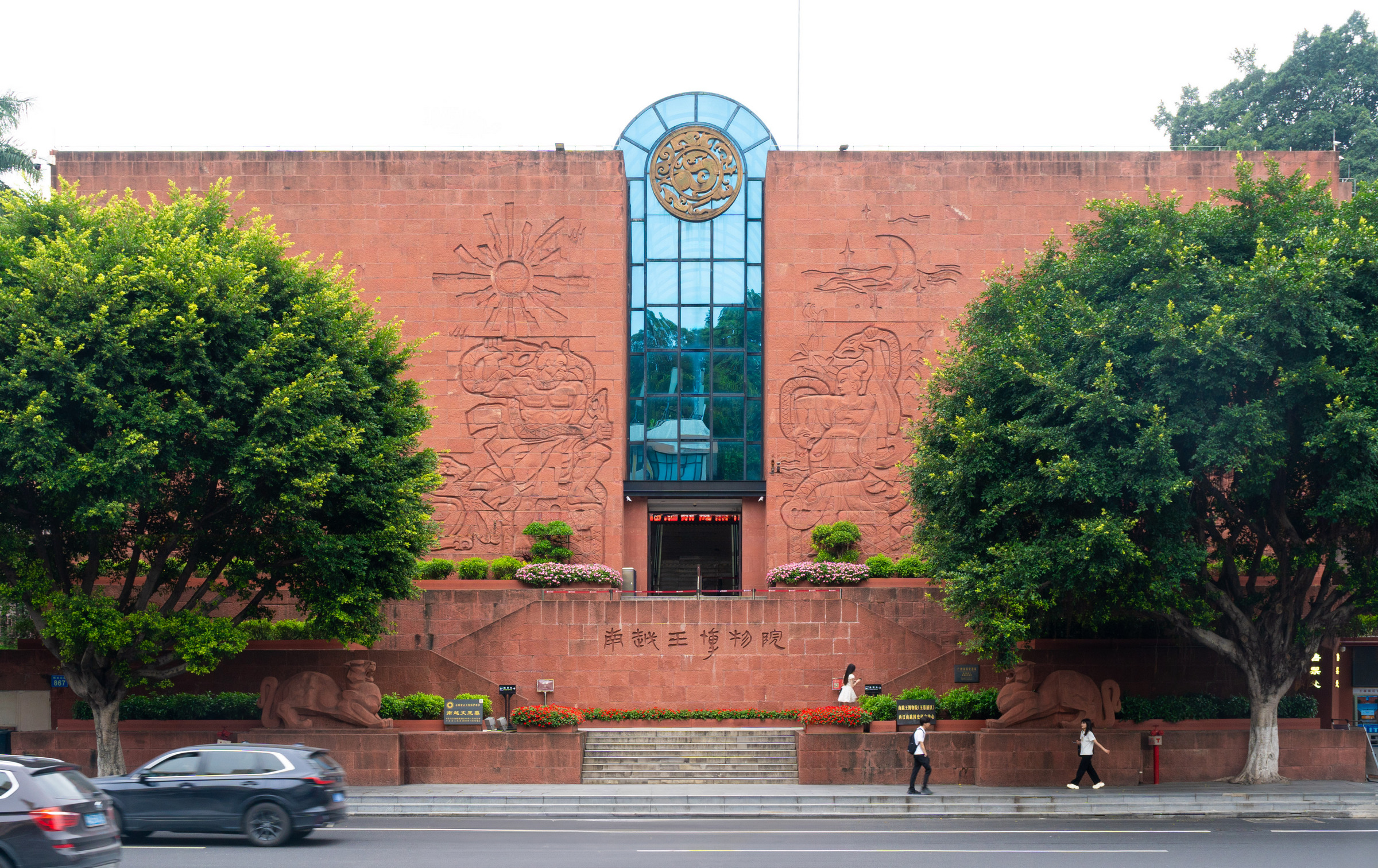
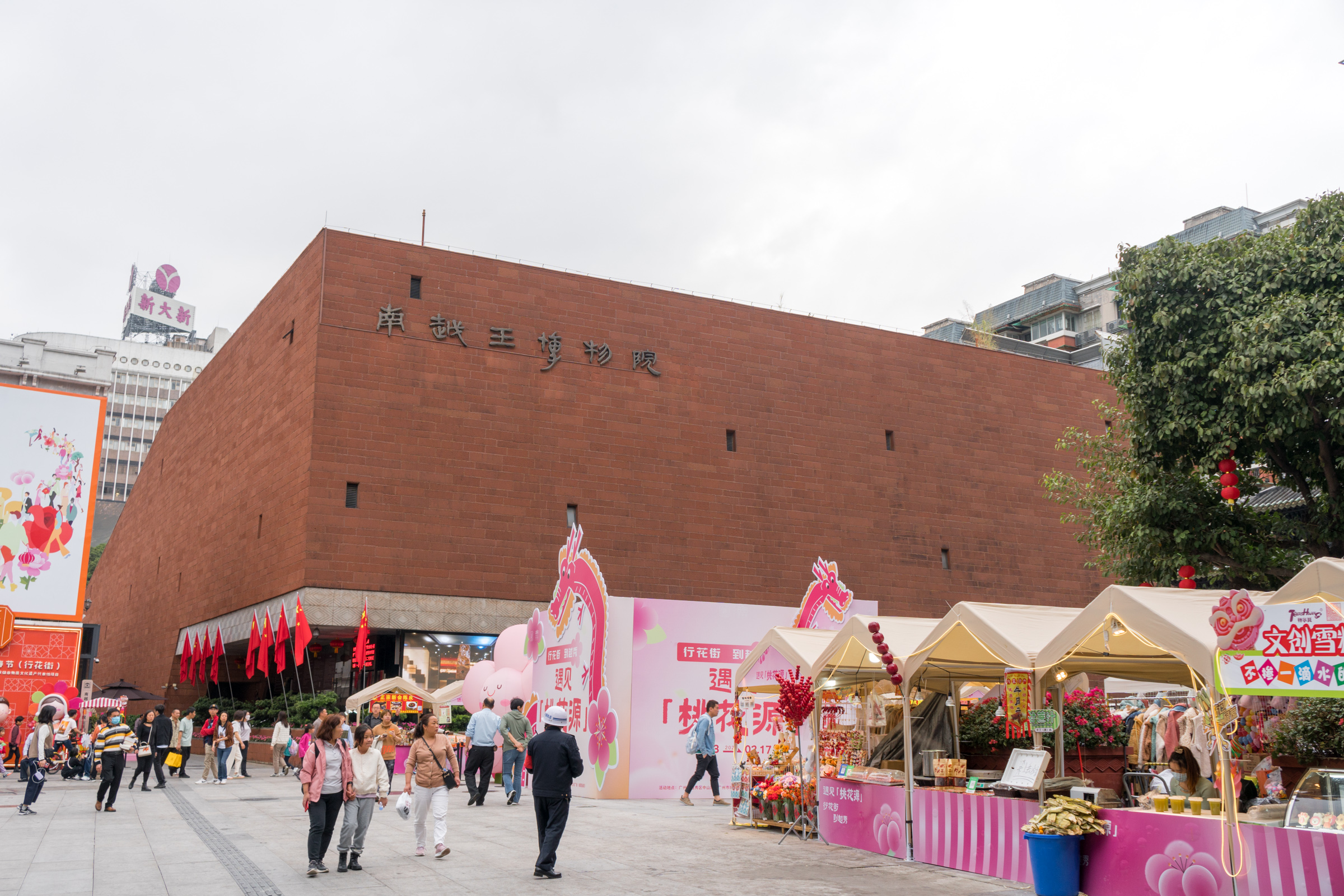
- Top: Site of King’s Tomb; Bottom: Site of Palace and Garden
- Established: 1988 - Mausoleum Museum of the Nanyue King of the Western Han Dynasty; 2014 - Museum of the Nanyue Palace Site; 2021 - Nanyue King Meseum
- Location: Yuexiu District, Guangzhou, Guangdong
- Coordinates: 23°8′25″N 113°15′20″E
- Type: Archaeology museum
- Website: www.nywmuseum.org.cn

Nanyue King Museum
- Traditional Chinese: 南越王博物院
- Simplified Chinese: 南越王博物院
- Literal meaning: Nanyue King Museum
Transcriptions
Standard Mandarin
- Hanyu Pinyin: Nányuè Wáng Bówùyuàn

The Nanyue King Museum is a large archaeology museum located in Guangzhou, China. Designated as a national first-grade museum, it was established on September 8, 2021, through the merger of the former Museum of the Mausoleum of the Nanyue King and the former Museum of the Nanyue Palace Site.

The museum primarily exhibits the archaeological discoveries and relics of the Nanyue, an ancient kingdom which ruled Lingnan region between 204 BC and 111 BC during the Western Han Dynasty. It currently comprises two sites: the Site of King's Tomb and the Site of Palace and Garden. The tomb belongs to Zhao Mo, the second king of the Nanyue, while the palace area encompasses the ruins of the royal palace. Both sites are recognized as national priority protected site. With a combined floor area of 40,000 square meters, it stands as a renowned tourist destination in Guangzhou.

== History ==
In June 1983, the Guangdong provincial government lowered Xianggang Hill near Yuexiu Hill by 17 meters to construct apartment buildings, unexpectedly uncovering a tomb buried within the hill. After archaeological excavation and identification, the tomb was confirmed as a Western Han Dynasty burial site belonging to Zhao Mo, the second king of the Nanyue. It was thus named the Mausoleum of the Nanyue King Wen, also known as the "Tomb of Nanyue King."

To preserve and showcase the tomb and its unearthed artifacts, the Guangzhou government decided to establish a museum on the original site. Designed by renowned Lingnan-style architects Mo Bozhi and He Jingtang, the museum opened in 1988 and was fully completed in 1993. Initially named the "Mausoleum Museum of the Nanyue King of the Western Han Dynasty", it was later renamed the "Museum of the Western Han Dynasty Mausoleum of the Nanyue King" in the 2000s.

In 1995, during construction at a site on Zhongshan Fourth Road, a corner of a large stone-built pool was discovered. It was later confirmed as part of the Nanyue period ruins. Subsequent excavations revealed more relics from the Nanyue era, including a meandering stone channel, wells, and palace ruins. Additionally, artifacts spanning 12 dynasties—from the Qin dynasty to the Republic of China—were uncovered, including palace ruins of Nanhan (the Southern Han) from the Five Dynasties period. Since 2006, Nanyue Kingdom Palace Ruins have been partially open to the public. The Guangzhou government later established the "Museum of the Nanyue Palace Site" on the original location, which partially opened in 2010 and fully opened in 2014.

On 8 September 2021, the Museum of the Western Han Dynasty Mausoleum of the Nanyue King and the Museum of the Nanyue Palace Site merged to form the new Nanyue King Museum. The former Museum of the Western Han Dynasty Mausoleum of the Nanyue King was renamed the "Site of King's Tomb, Nanyue King Museum" while the former Museum of the Nanyue Palace Site became the "Site of Palace and Garden, Nanyue King Museum".

== Layout ==
=== Site of King's Tomb ===
==== The Tomb ====
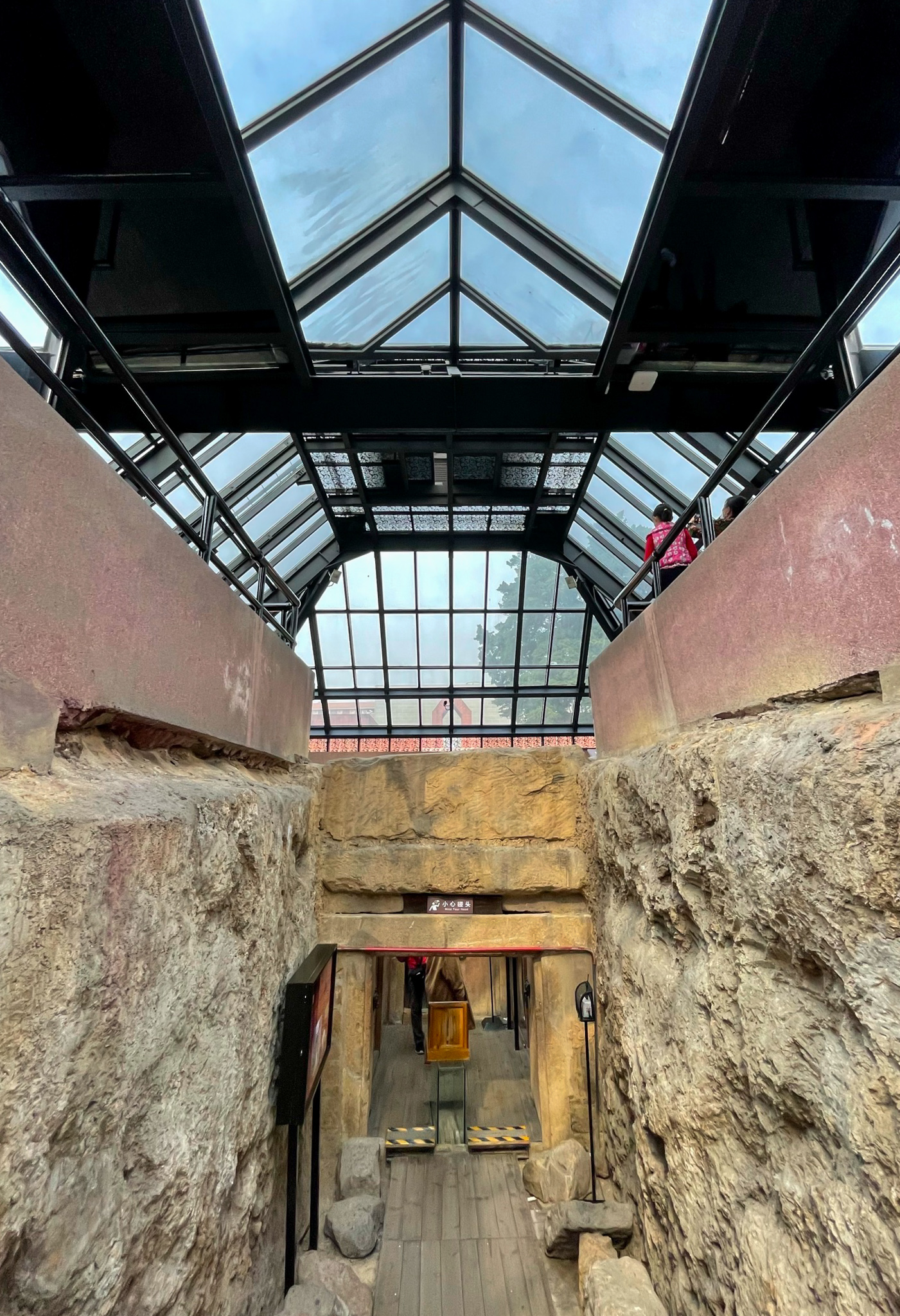
Inside the tomb protection zone

The Nanyue King's Tomb is buried approximately 20 meters deep within the core of Xianggang Hill. Over 750 red sandstone blocks used in its construction were quarried from Lotus Hill, located dozens of kilometers from Guangzhou city center. The estimated volume of earth and rock excavated for the tomb exceeds 3,000 cubic meters. Initially, archaeologists discovered that one tomb door had collapsed, leading them to suspect the tomb had been robbed. Later investigations revealed that the collapse resulted from a natural landslide, confirming that the tomb remained remarkably intact—a rare treasure given that most other tombs in Guangzhou had been looted.

The tomb's layout forms a cross-shaped plan, combining vertical pit and horizontal tunnel designs: the main structure is a vertical pit, while the eastern and western side chambers were carved horizontally. Oriented north-south, the tomb measures 10.85 meters in length and up to 12.5 meters in width, covering a floor area of about 100 square meters. It follows a symmetrical axis and is divided into front and rear sections replicating the "front court, rear living quarters" palace layout, comprising seven distinct chambers:

- Front Chamber: Symbolizing the king's reception hall. Artifacts unearthed here include chariot and horse fittings, along with remains of a human sacrifice—likely a eunuch attendant.
- Eastern Side Chamber: Reserved for banquet and musical instruments. A sacrificial victim, possibly a court musician, was found here.
- Western Side Chamber: Functioned as a royal treasury, yielding the highest number of artifacts (295 sets/items), spanning gold, silver, bronze, iron, jade, glass, and textiles.
- Main Coffin Chamber: Contained the decayed coffin of the king. Key discoveries here include a jade burial suit woven with silk threads, the gold seal "Imperial Seal of Emperor Wen" (文帝行玺), and the jade seal "Zhào Mò" (赵昩)—critical evidence confirming the tomb's occupant.
- Eastern Annex Chamber: Burial site for the king's four concubines.
- Western Annex Chamber: Quarters for sacrificial servants.
- Rear Storage Chamber: Stored cooking utensils and food vessels.

The southern approach features a sloped tomb passage. Outside the first stone door, an outer burial pit contained a sacrificial victim alongside pottery urns and chariot fittings. The second stone door separated the front and rear sections. Unable to open it externally, archaeologists excavated a narrow tunnel beneath the door to access the main coffin chamber, subsequently unlocking the door from within—secured by a stone doorstop.

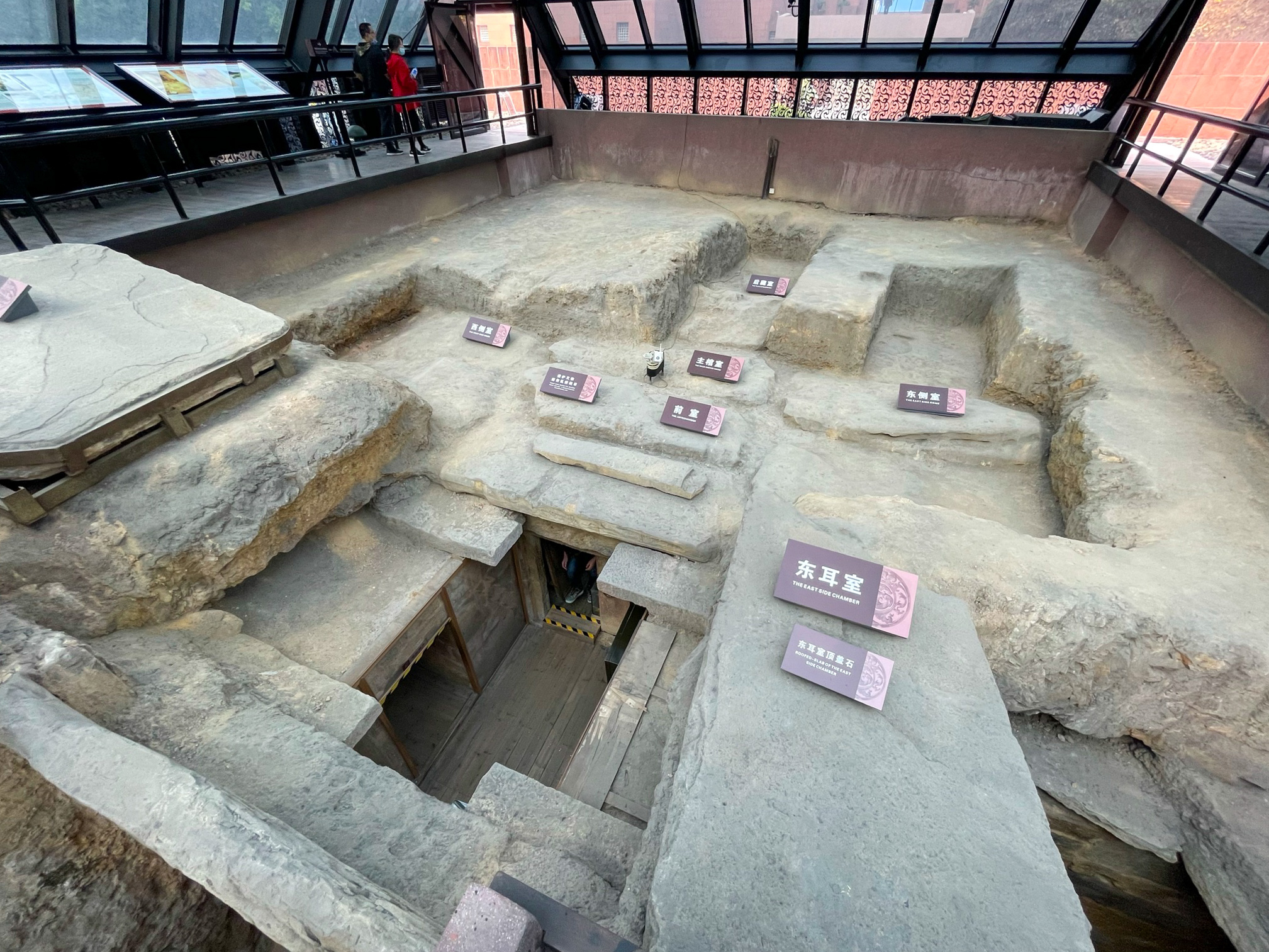
Overview of the tomb

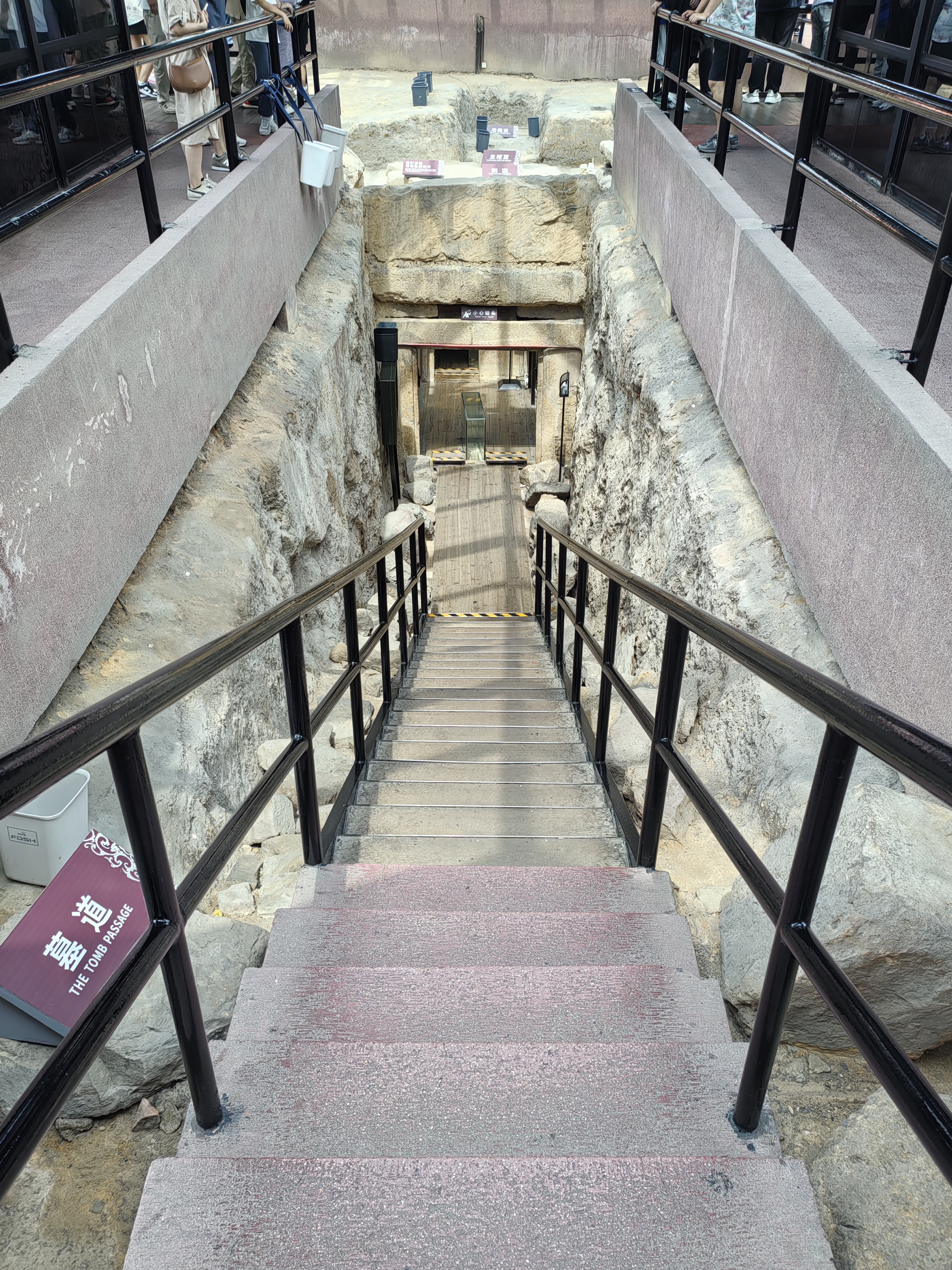
Tomb passage

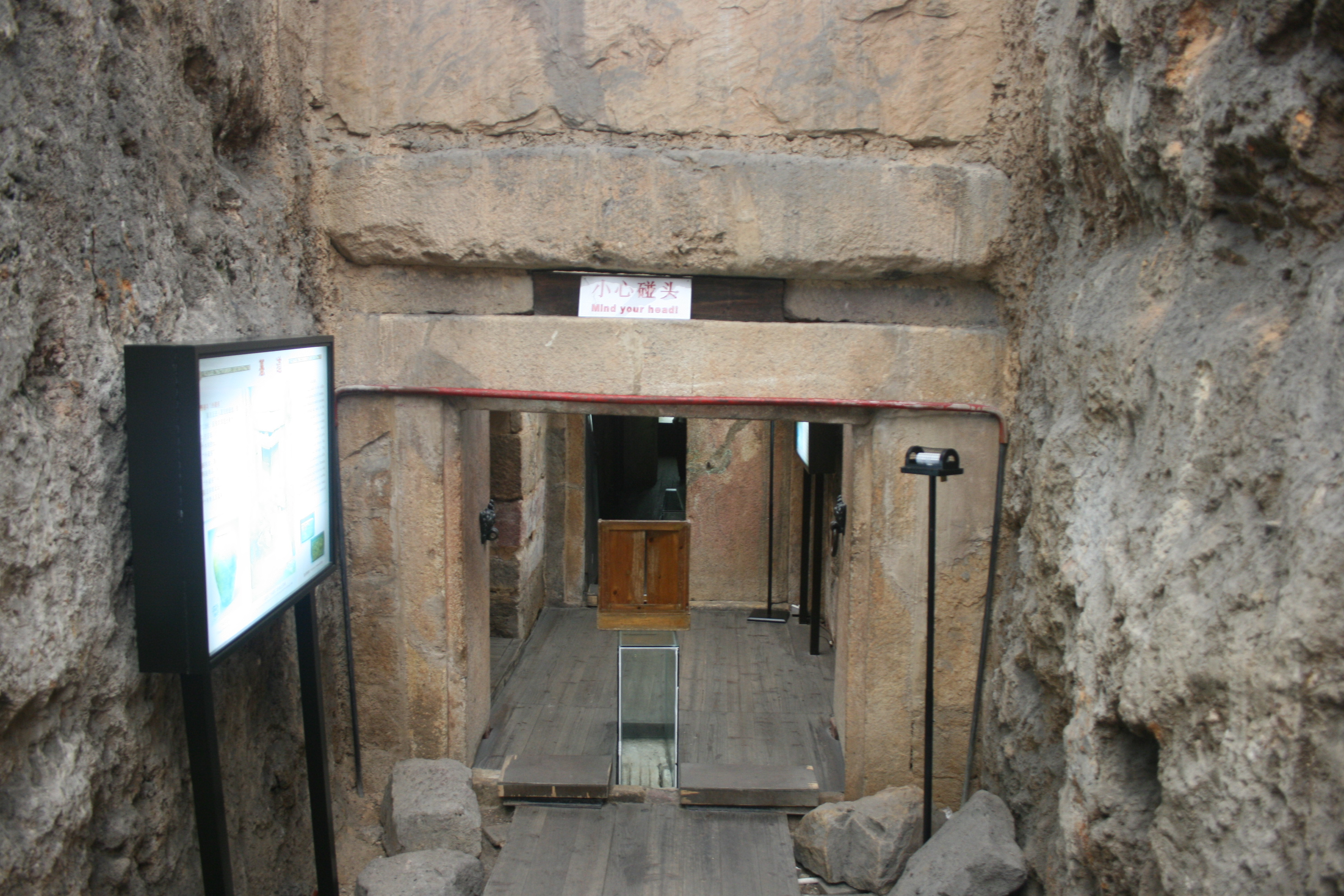
Tomb entrance

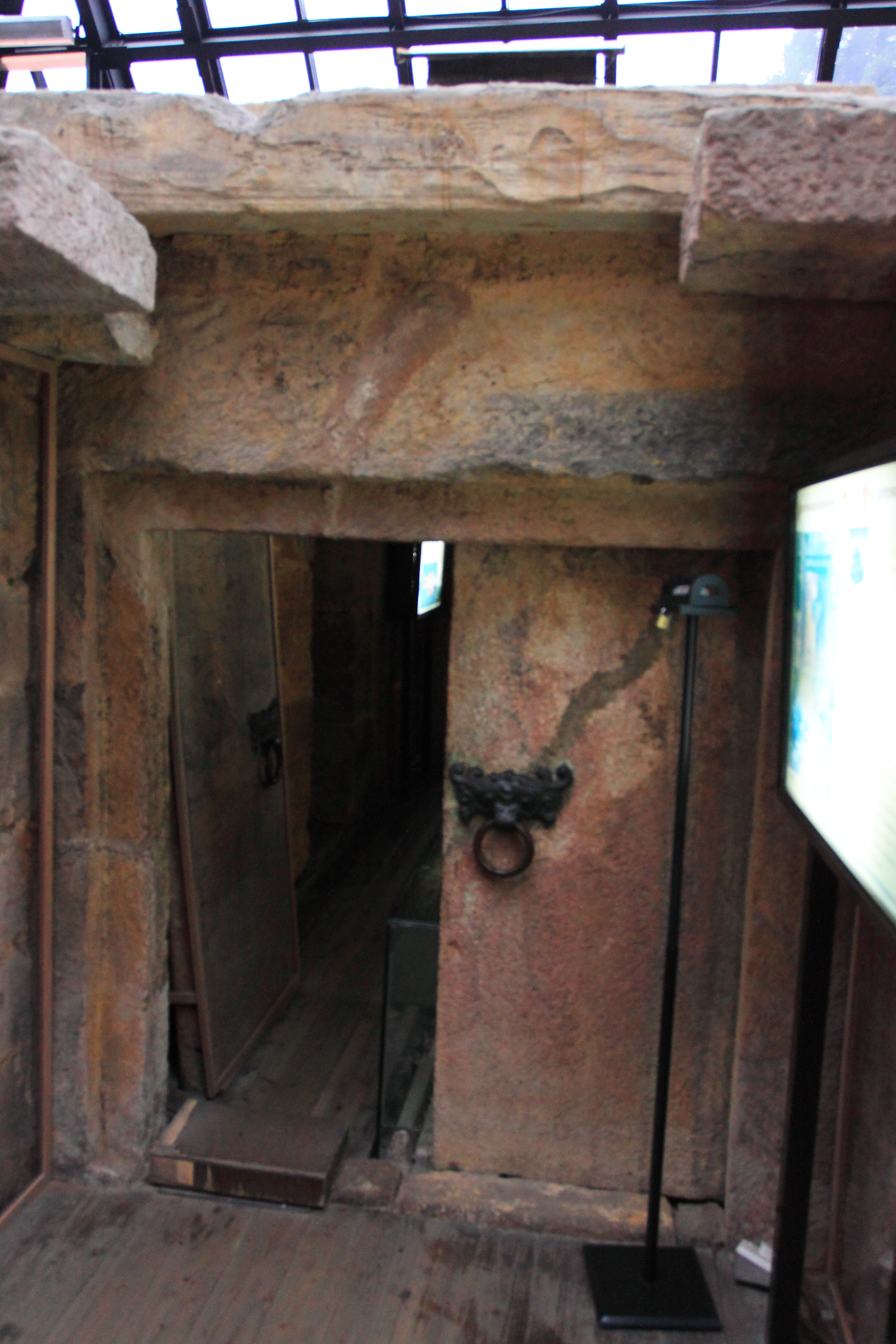
Stone door separating the Front Chamber and the Main Coffin Chamber

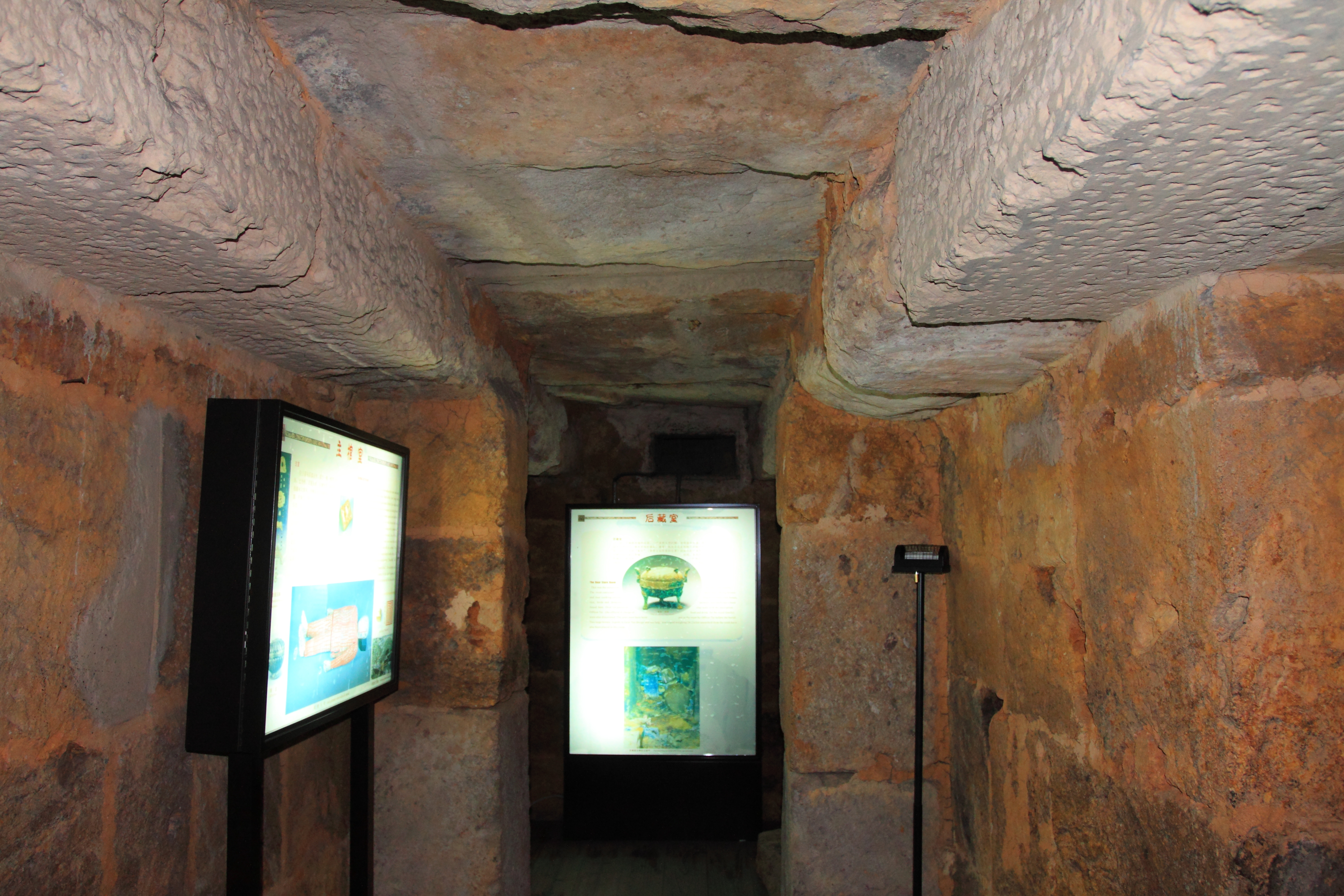
Interior of the Main Coffin Chamber

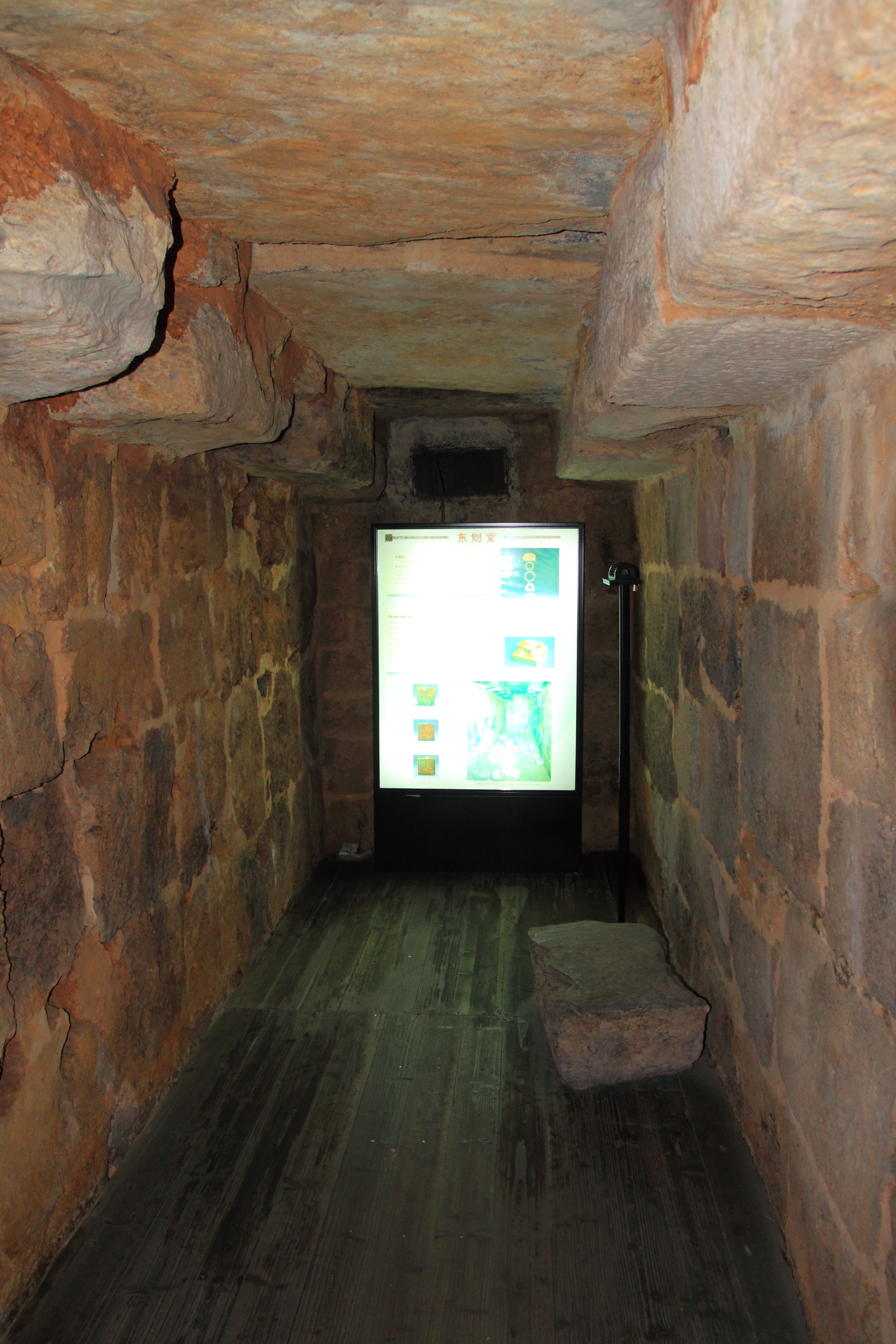
Eastern Annex Chamber

==== The Architecture ====
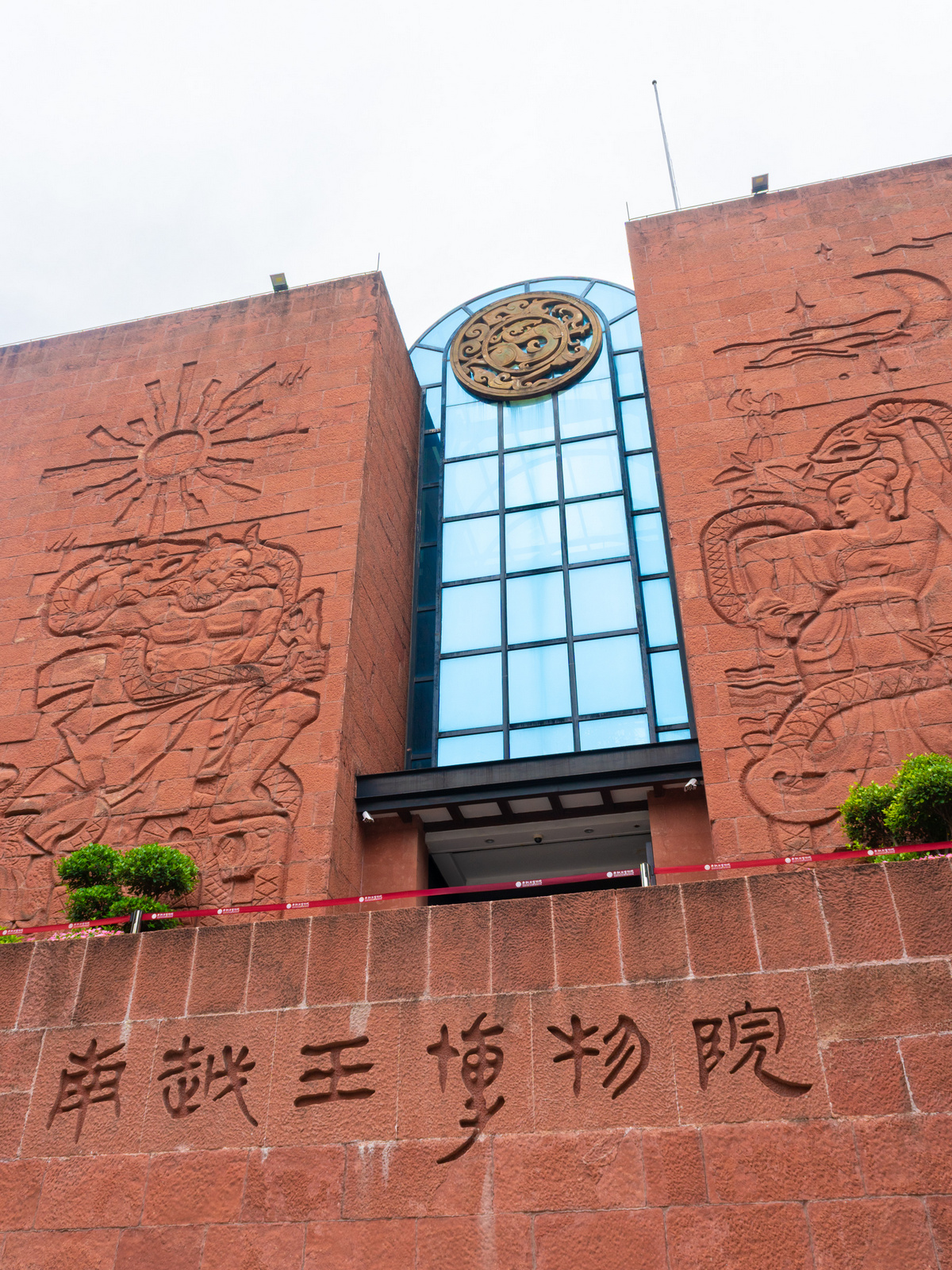
The front facade of the reception building in the Site of King's Tomb

Designed by renowned Lingnan-style architects Mo Bozhi and He Jingtang, the museum complex centers around the ancient tomb and is built into the hillside, covering a construction area of over 17,400 square meters. It comprises three main sections: the reception building, the tomb protection zone, and the main exhibition building. Red sandstone—similar to that used in the tomb—serves as the primary construction material, while exterior wall carvings were created by the eminent sculptor Pan He.

The reception building is a three-story entrance structure with staircases ascending the hillside toward the tomb protection zone, where the tomb chamber is covered by a funnel-shaped steel-framed glass canopy, symbolizing the truncated pyramidal mound typical of Han imperial mausoleums. Encircling walkways allow visitors to descend into the tomb via its original passageway. The main exhibition nuilding is located north of the tomb protection zone. This windowless structure relies solely on controlled indoor lighting and minimal natural light from a glazed atrium skylight, recreating the tomb's somber ambiance.

For its exceptional design, the museum received six national and international awards, including National Gold Medal for Outstanding Design, Excellent Architectural Design Award (Architectural Society of China), First Prize for Outstanding Design (1991, State Education Commission and Ministry of Construction). It was also honored as a "World Architectural Masterpiece of the 20th Century" and remains an iconic example of Lingnan modern architecture.

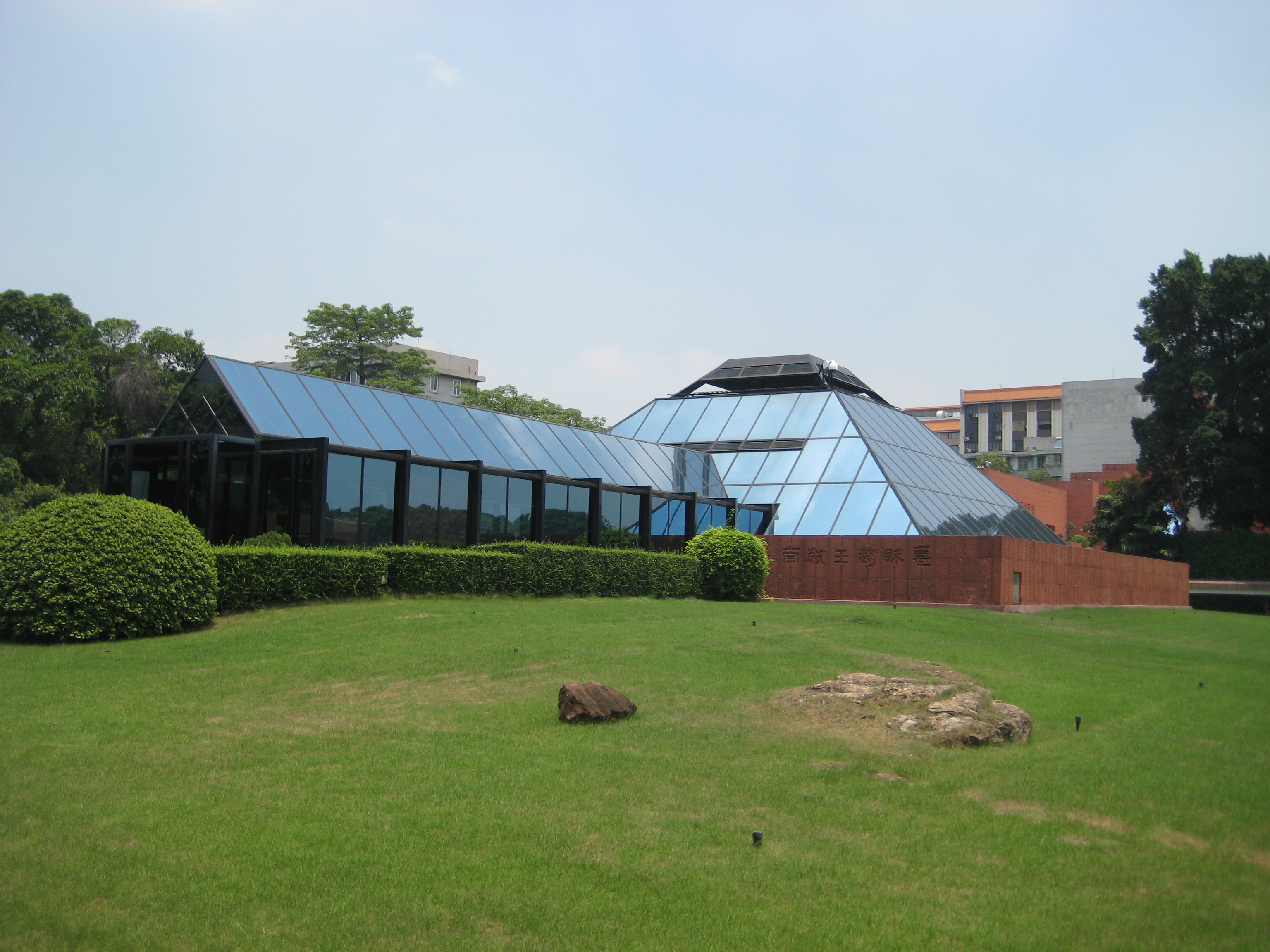
Exterior of the tomb protection zone

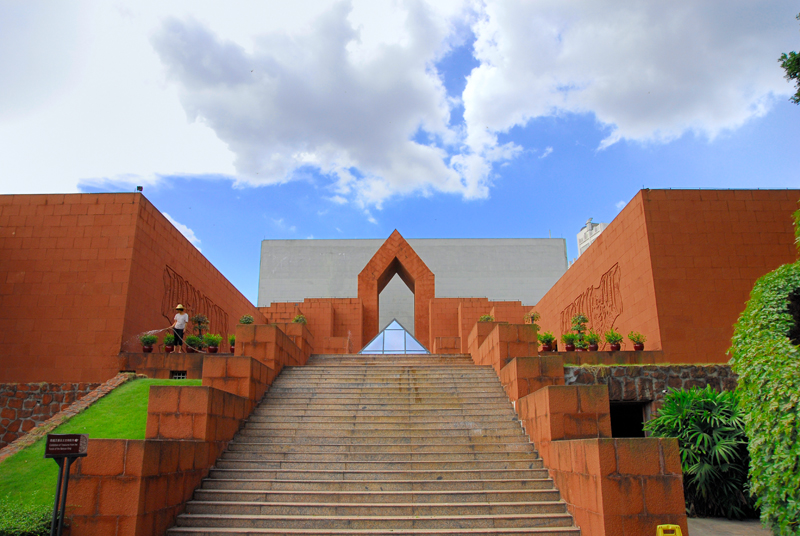
The main exhibition building

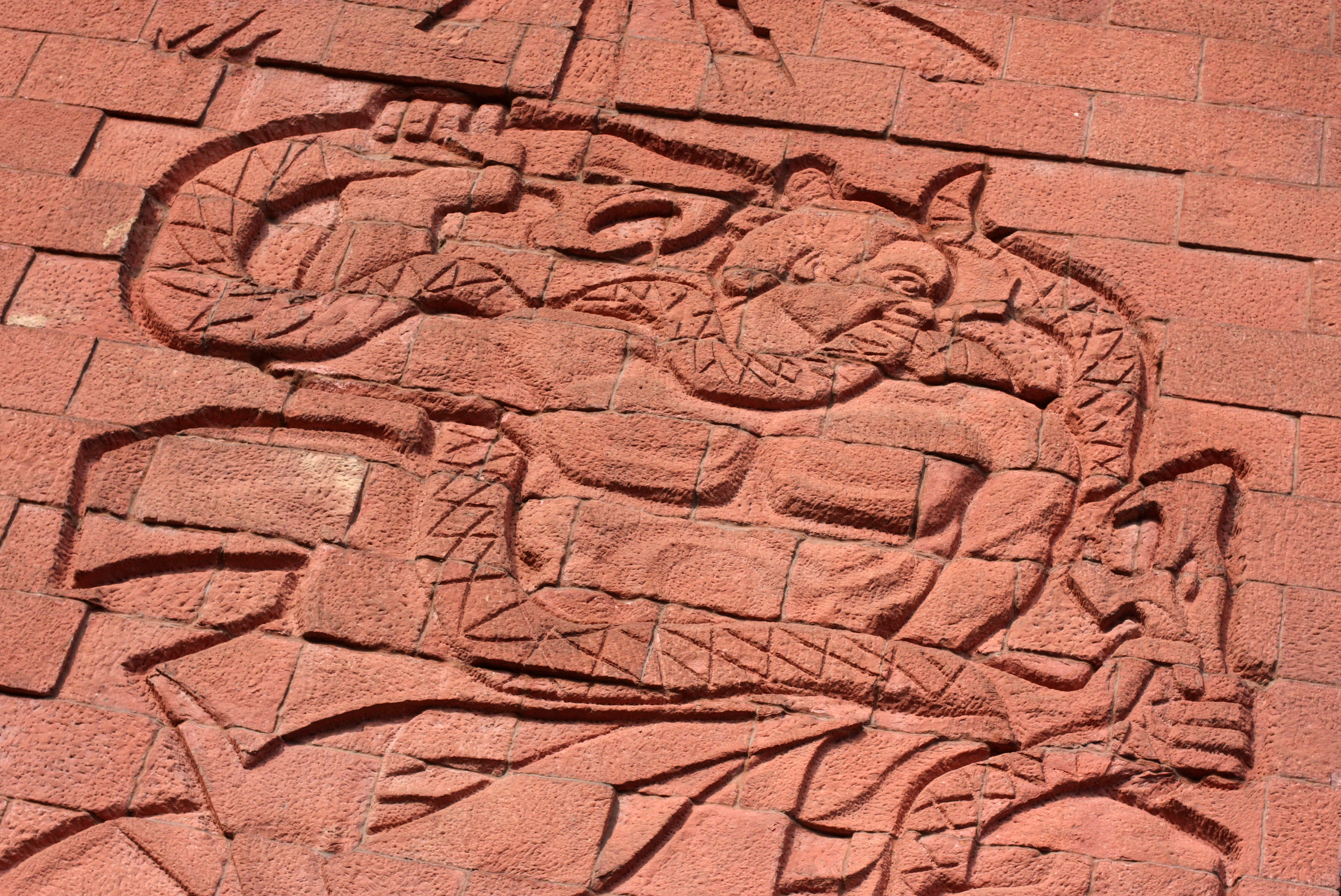
Exterior wall carving

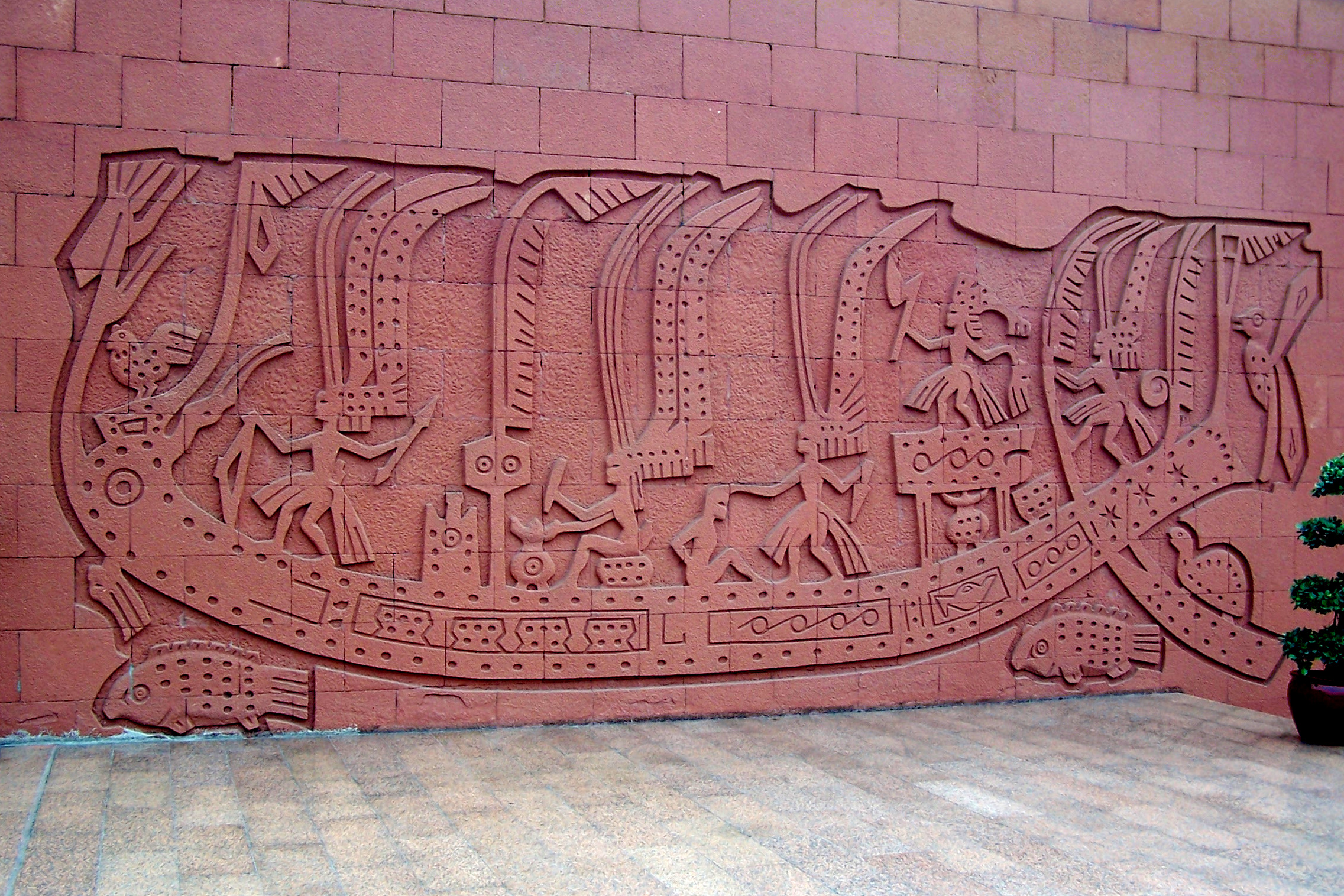
Exterior wall carving

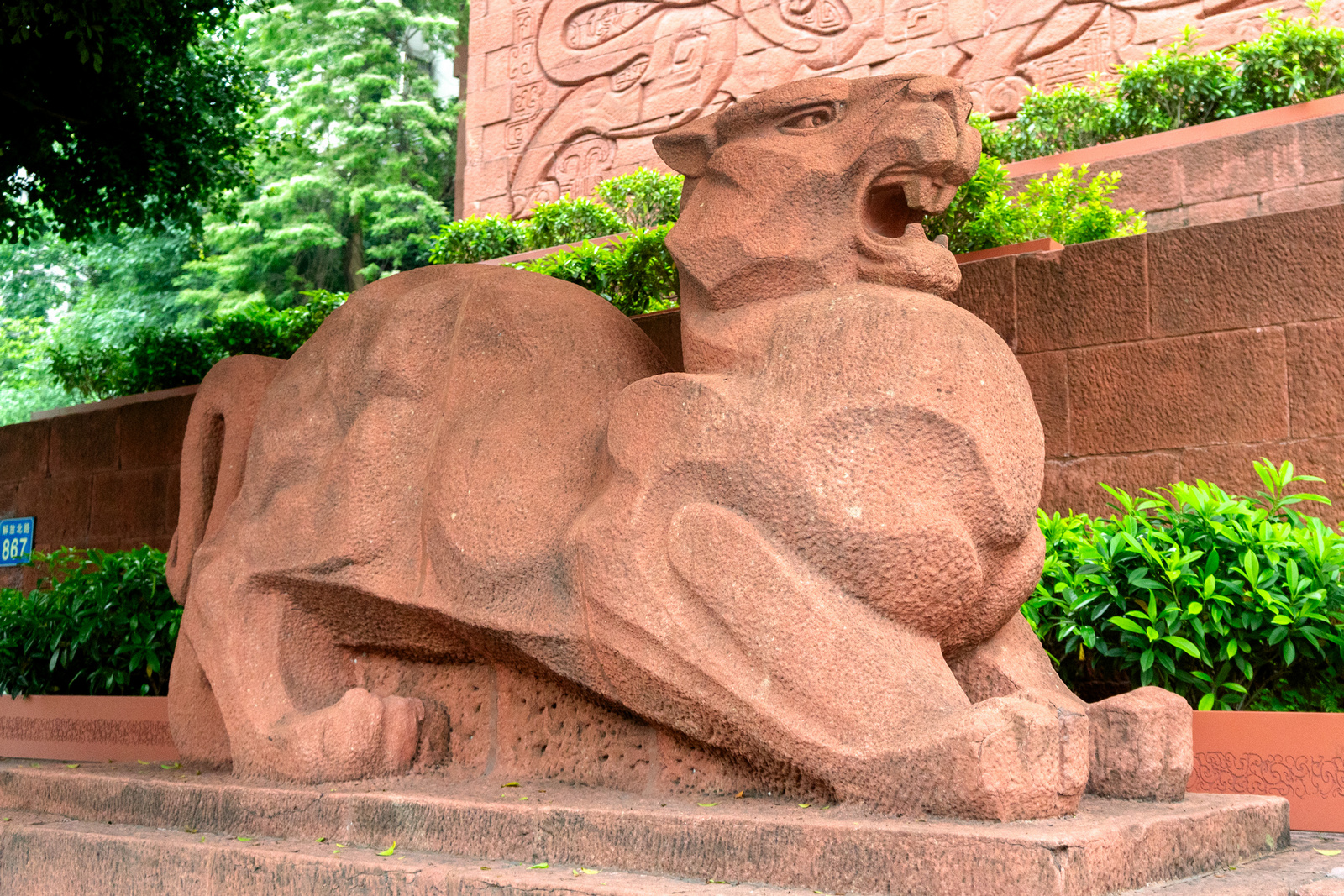
Tiger sculpture in front of the reception building.

=== Site of Palace and Garden ===
==== The Ruins ====
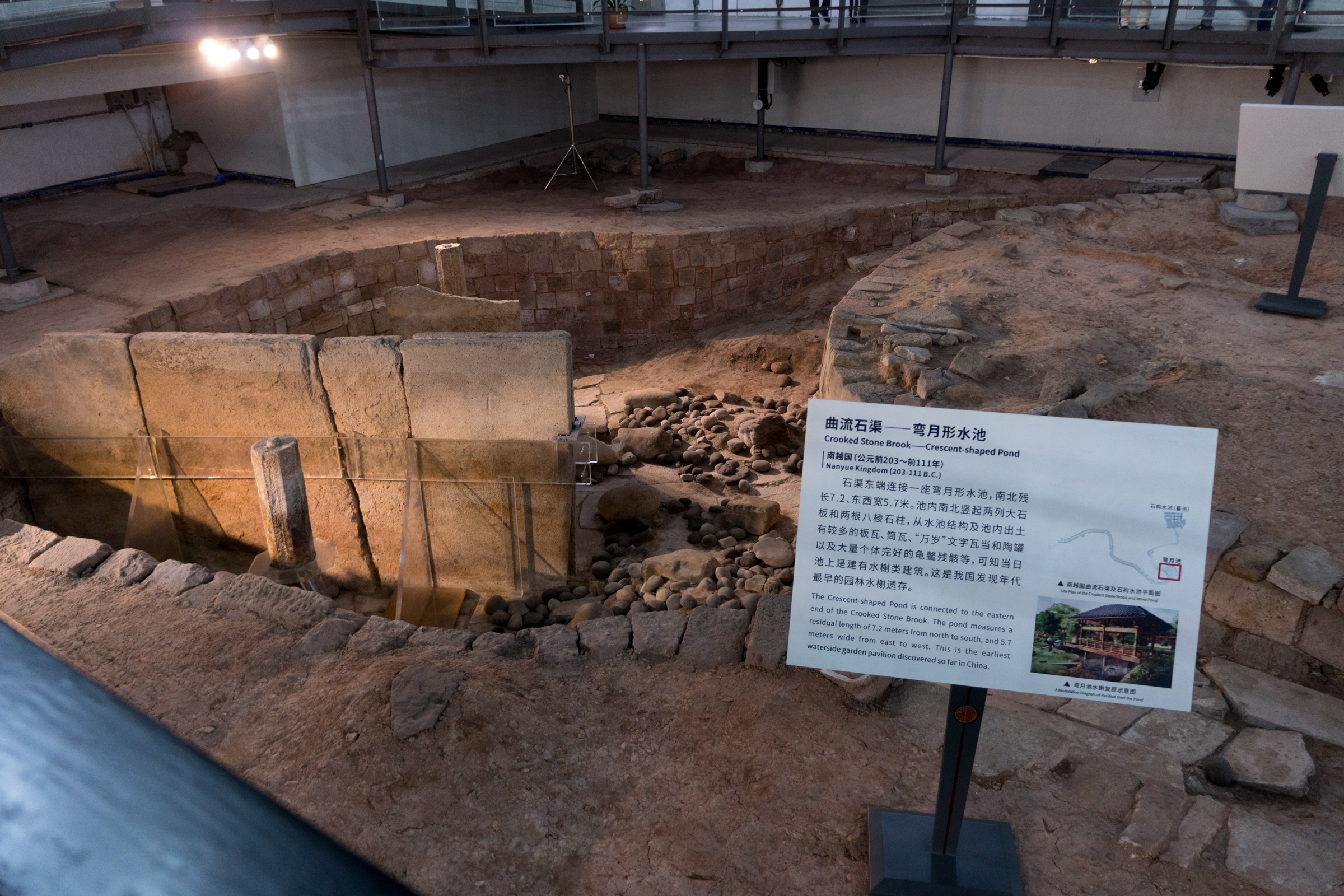
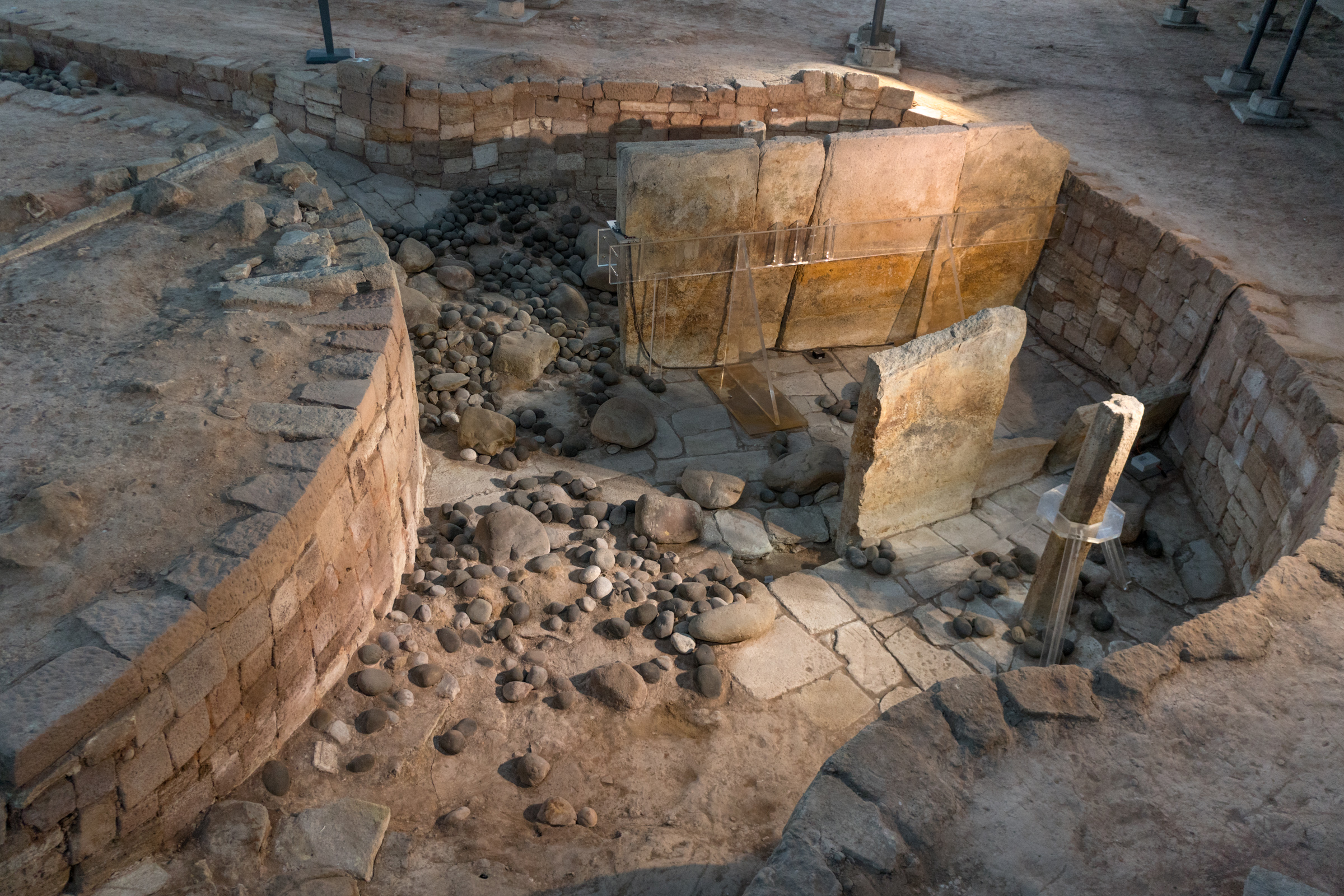
Ruin of the Crooked Stone Brook of Nanyue

Also known as the "Nanyue Kingdom Palace Ruins", the Site of Palace and Garden traces its discovery to 1995, when a corner of a large stone-built pool was unearthed. The pool's stone slabs bore inscriptions like "蕃" (Fān), confirming its origin in the Nanyue era. This breakthrough earned it a spot among China's Top Ten Archaeological Discoveries of 1995. Later named "Pan Pond" (Fān Chí) based on unearthed wooden slips, it was preserved in situ through backfilling.

In 1997, the adjacent Crooked Stone Brook from the Nanyue was discovered. Linked to the Pan Pond via a wooden underground trough, these structures formed an imperial garden waterscape—China's earliest and most intact Qin-Han palace landscape—garnering another Top Ten Archaeological Discovery award in 1997.

The discovery of the Pan Pond and Crooked Stone Brook indicated that more significant Nanyue ruins might exist nearby. With approval from the National Cultural Heritage Administration, a joint archaeological team—comprising the Institute of Archaeology of the Chinese Academy of Social Sciences, the Guangzhou Municipal Institute of Cultural Heritage and Archaeology, and the Preparatory Office of the Nanyue Palace Museum—conducted trial excavations in 2000 at the adjacent Children's Park. These digs revealed the foundations of Hall One of the Nanyue Kingdom and Hall Two of the Southern Han.

Subsequently, the Guangzhou government decided to relocate the Children's Park. Following state approval, systematic archaeological excavations commenced on the site, covering approximately 12,000 square meters. The project uncovered over 4,800 cultural remains spanning multiple dynasties, including the Palaces of the Nanyue Kingdom and Southern Han Kingdom, the Tang dynasty Jiedushi's (regional military governor's) Office, the Song dynasty Guangzhou Magistrate's Office, the Yuan dynasty Guangzhou Marshal's Residence and the Ming and Qing Guangdong Provincial Administration Office. These remnants—stacked in layers up to 5 meters deep—serve as a tangible witness to Guangzhou's urban evolution across two millennia.

The Crooked Stone Brook from the Nanyue Kingdom period is the centerpiece of the current exhibition. This stone watercourse originally extended 180 meters, with 160 meters preserved today. It winds from the northeast to the southwest, featuring artificial hydraulic structures including a sharp bend, crescent-shaped pond, down slopes, through bridges and over stepping-stones. The water is channeled from the Pan Pond. The flow first reaches the sharp bend, creating turbulent vortices, then diverts southeast into the crescent-shaped pond, where an overhead pavilion was supported by two rows of stone slabs and two octagonal pillars. Turtle habitat is confirmed by abundant fragmented turtle shells on the pond bed. The flow then turns northwest through wave-generating slopes (arched stone slabs that agitate water), stone access ramps for turtles to climb ashore and broad stone bridges crossing the channel.

The landscape artistry embodies sophisticated Qin-Han garden engineering with its meandering, multi-functional design. It's worth noting that the octagonal pillars are neither found elsewhere in contemporaneous China nor rooted in Lingnan traditions. Instead, they bears striking resemblance to Indian architecture of the same era, suggesting maritime exchange via ancient sea routes. The discovery compels scholars to rethink the evolution of Chinese architecture, highlighting early East-West cultural dialogue.

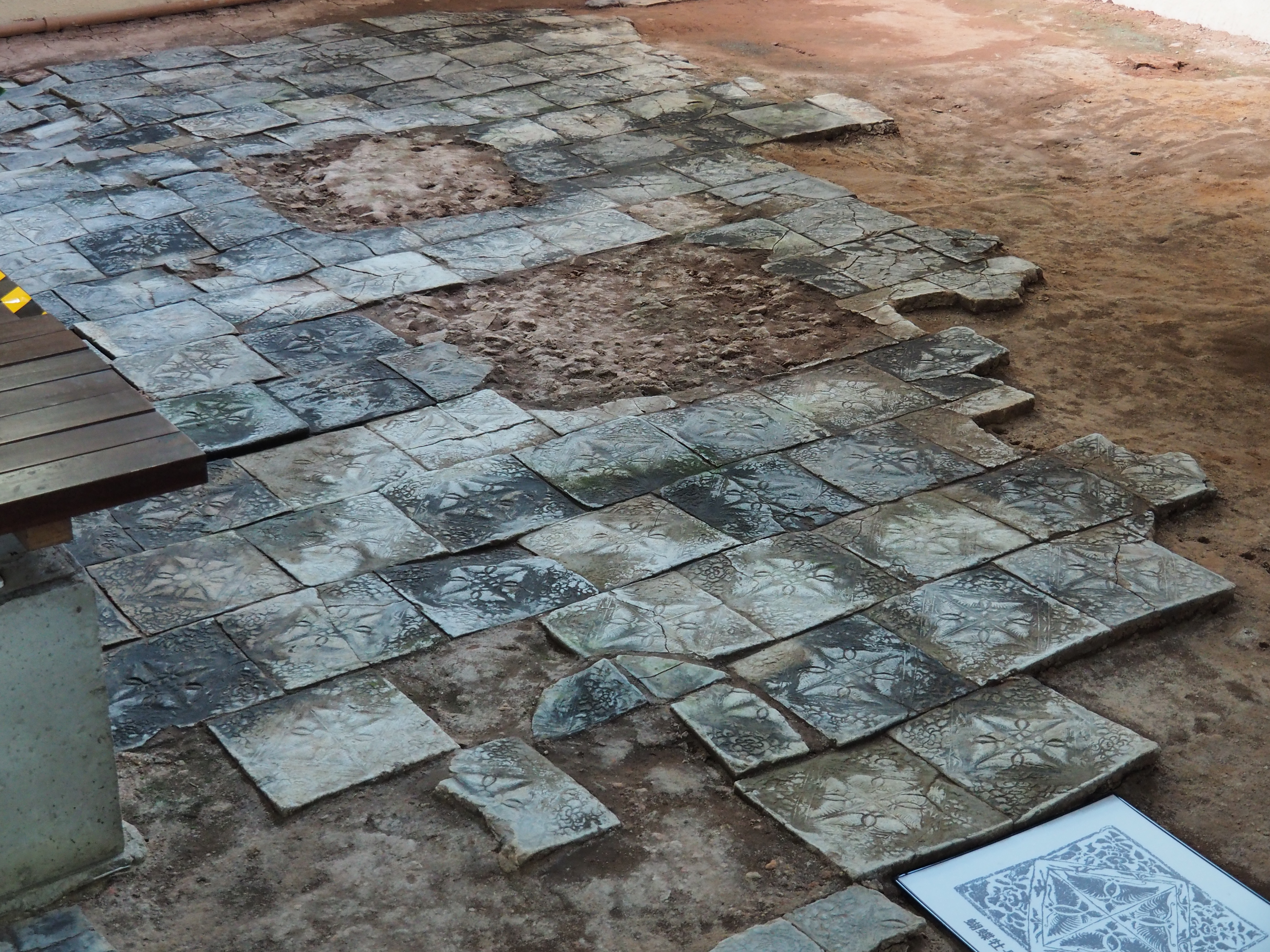
Square Bricks with Butterfly and Flower Design of the Southern Han

Another prominent feature exhibited at the Site of Palace and Garden is the palace complex of the Nanhan (Southern Han) Kingdom (917–971 CE), a regional power established by Liu Yan during the Five Dynasties and Ten Kingdoms period with Guangzhou as its capital until its defeat by the Northern Song dynasty in 971 CE. The Southern Han palace foundations discovered here directly overlie those of the earlier Nanyue Kingdom palace, providing compelling evidence that two distinct dynasties separated by a millennium successively chose this exact location for their royal seats. This remarkable stratigraphic continuity confirms the site's uninterrupted significance as Guangzhou's political, economic, and cultural nucleus throughout history. Archaeological investigations have identified two Southern Han palace structures, designated as Hall One and Hall Two. Among these, Hall Two stands out as a monumental north-south oriented complex featuring interconnected halls, courtyards, and corridors organized in a multi-courtyard layout. Elevated on an imposing stone-brick platform showcasing exquisite Five Dynasties masonry, it ranks among the largest palace foundations ever excavated in China. Based on its strategic position, grand scale, and corroborating historical records, this structure has been conclusively identified as the Qianhedian Throne Hall – the primary audience chamber where Southern Han emperors conducted state affairs.

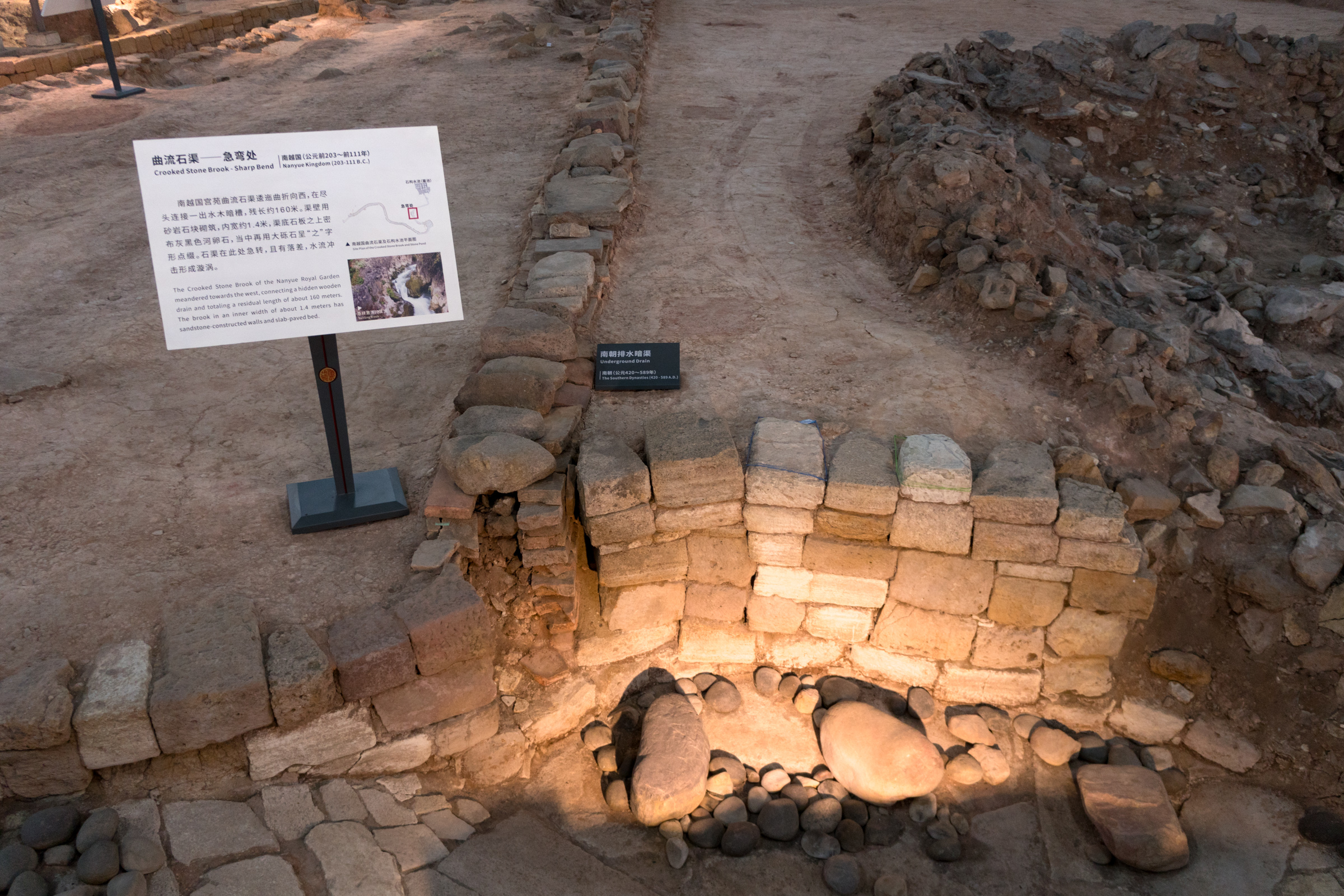
Sharp bend at the Crooked Stone Brook of Nanyue

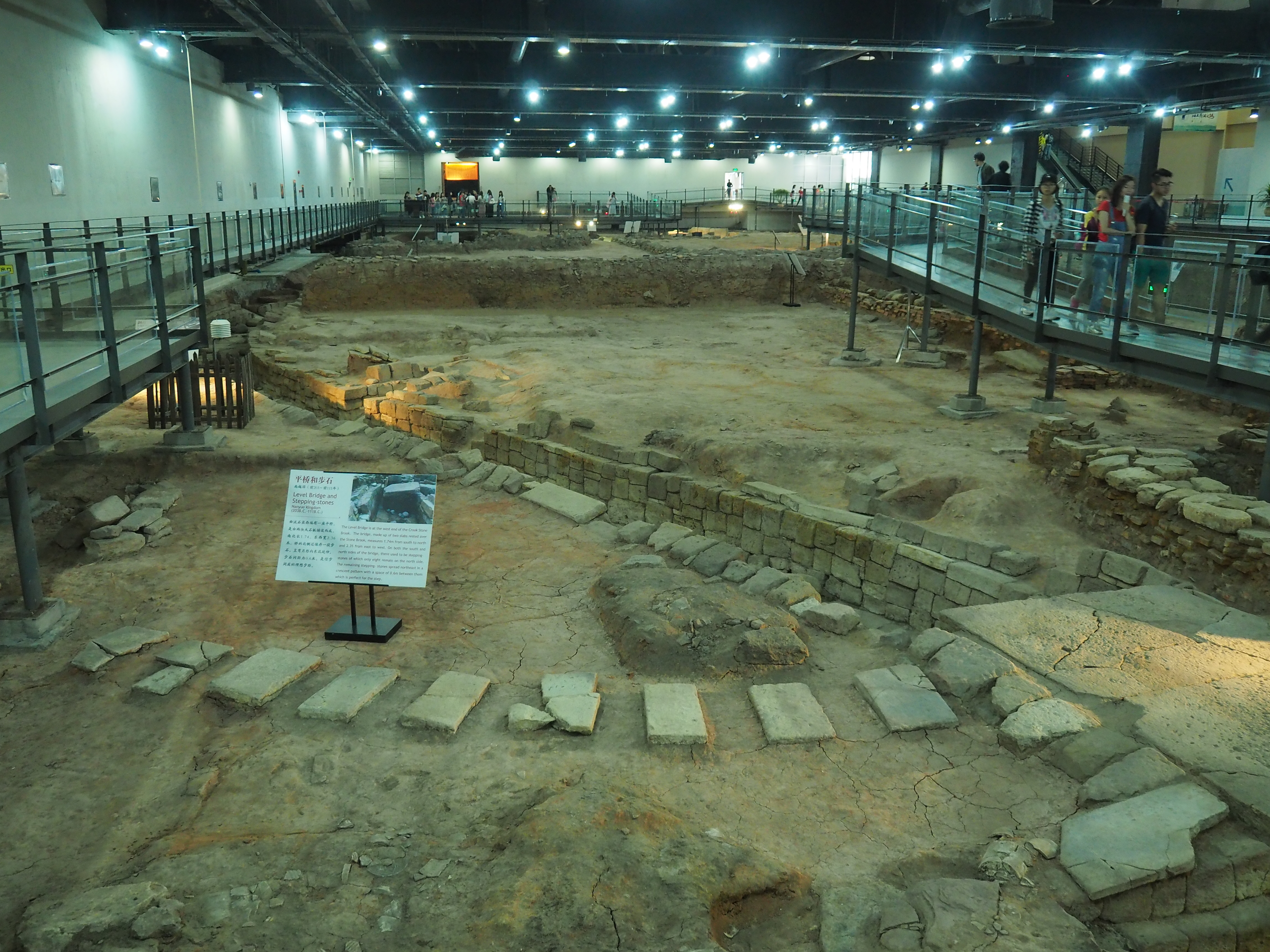
Stone level bridge and stepping-stones of Nanyue

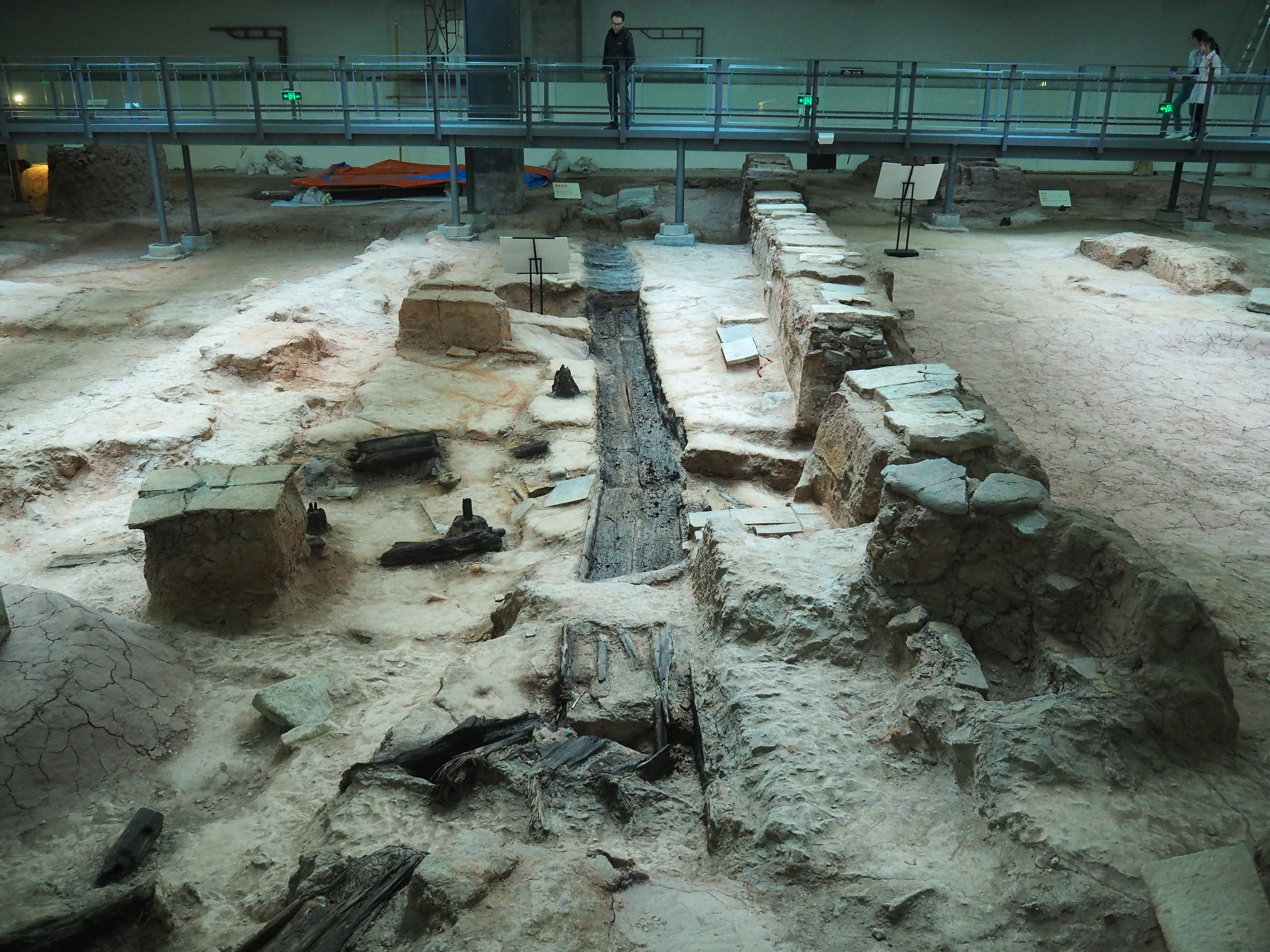
Underground trough of Nanyue

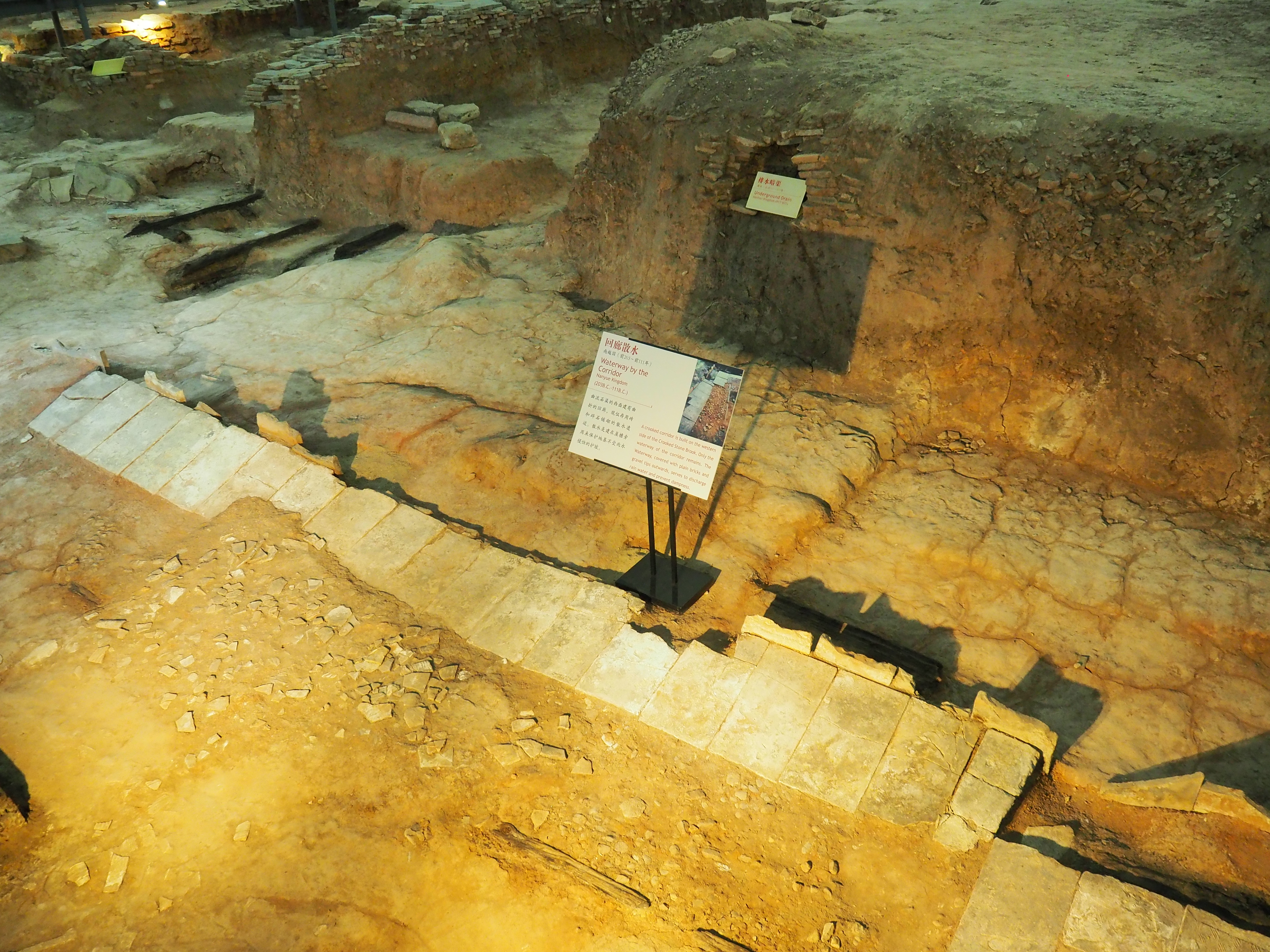
Waterway by the corridor of Nanyue

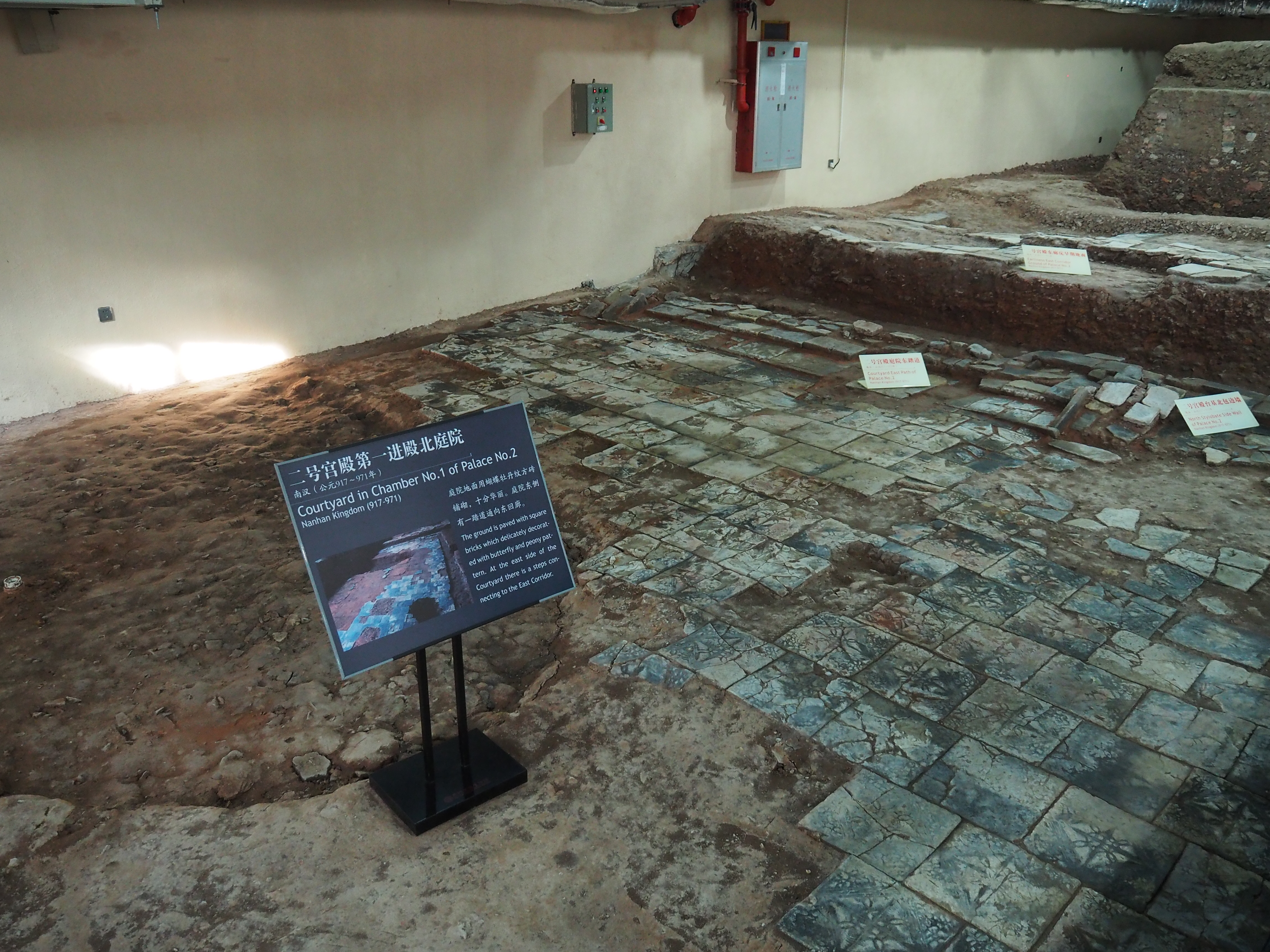
Courtyard in Chamber One of Hall Two of the Southern Han

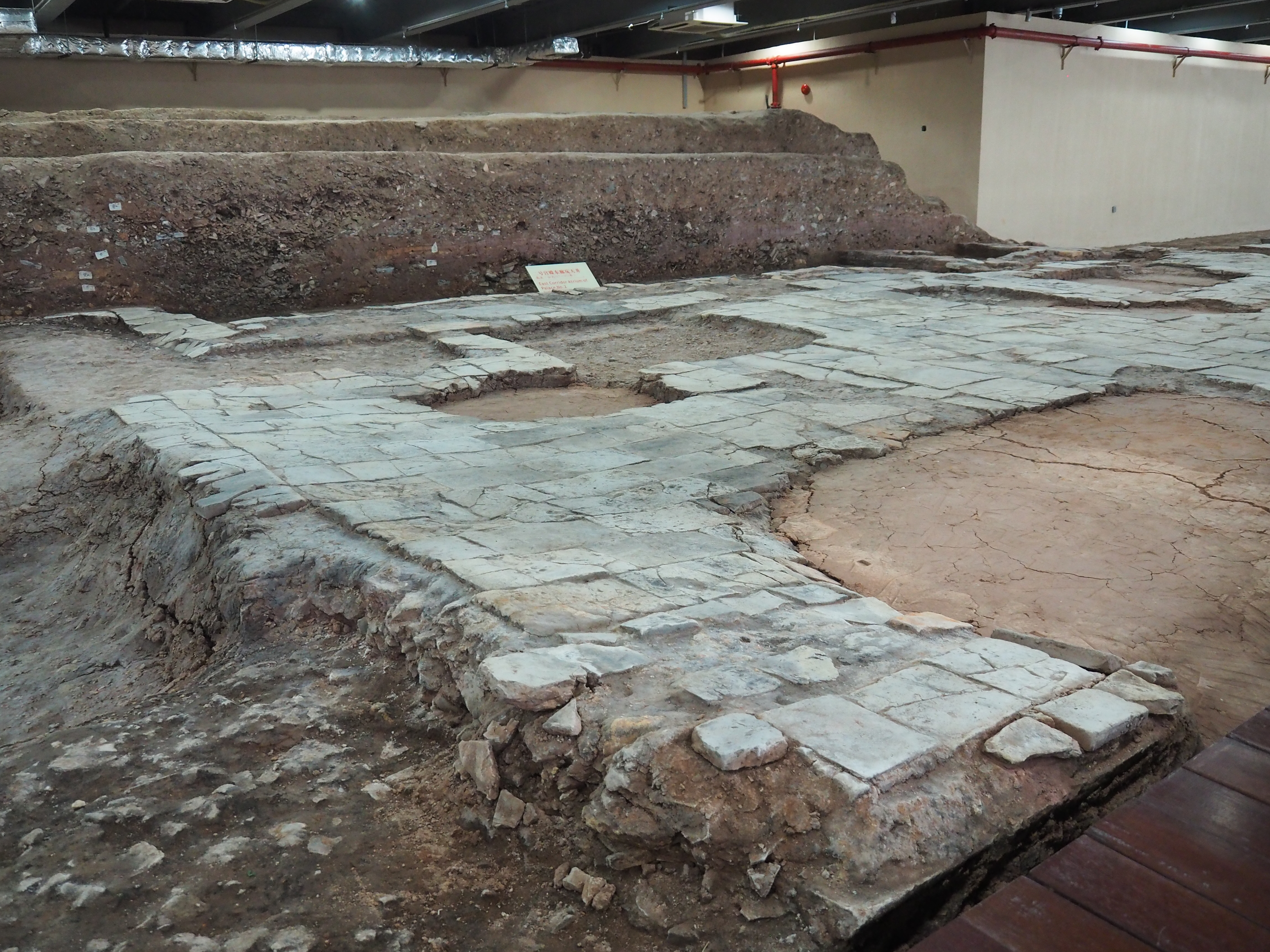
East corridor atrium of Hall Two of the Southern Han

==== The Architecture ====
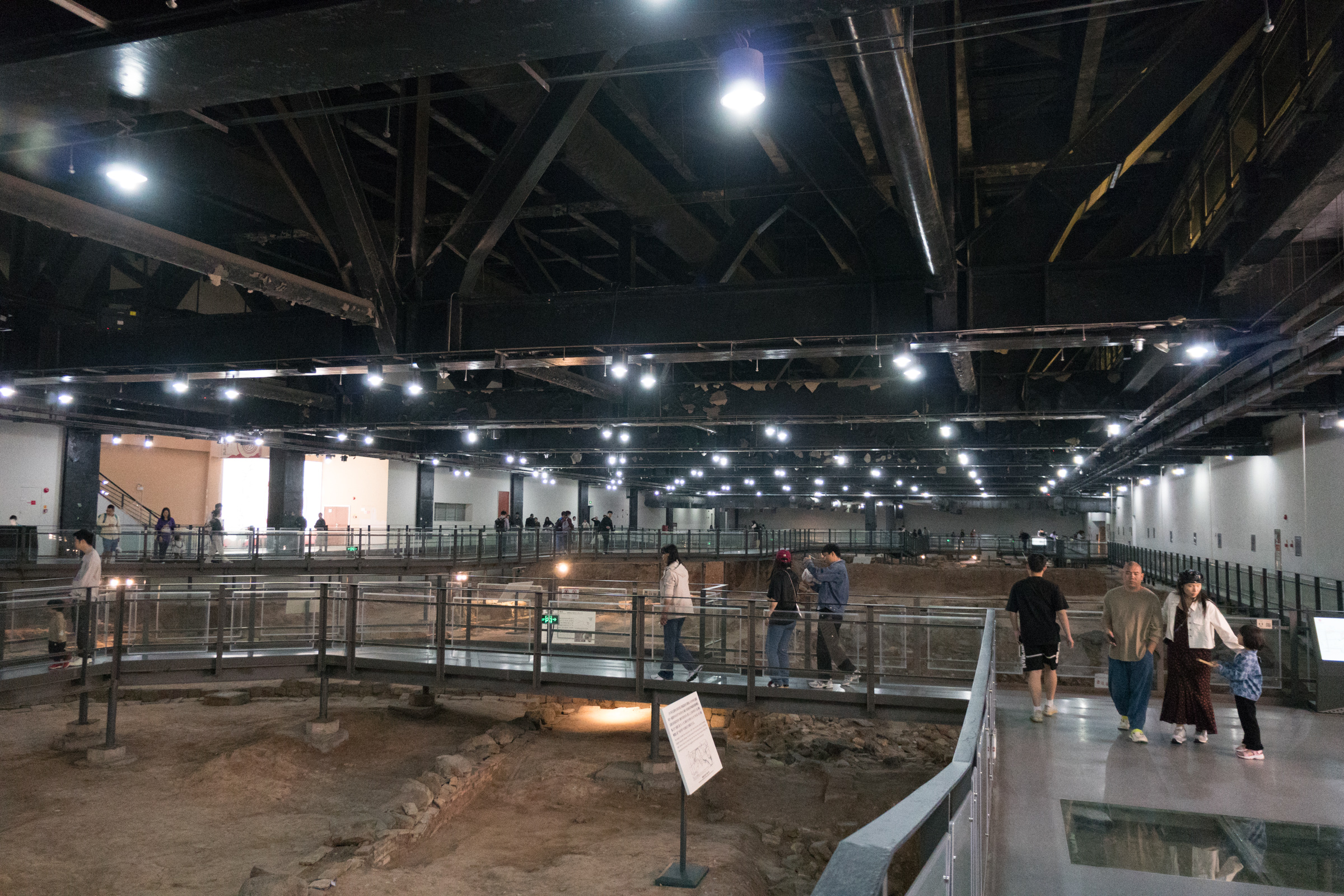
Interior of the Nanyue Palace Garden Building showcasing the Crooked Stone Brook

The Site of Palace and Garden is a comprehensive archaeological site museum centered around the Nanyue Kingdom Palace Ruins, integrating preservation, exhibition, management, archaeological research, and academic functions. It comprises four distinct sections:

- Nanyue Palace Garden Building: Built directly over the Crooked Stone Brook, this structure fully encloses the ancient watercourse for protected display. Elevated walkways allow visitors to observe the 2,000-year-old channel, wells, and drainage systems at close range. The rooftop features an open-air simulated reconstruction of the watercourse.
- Southern Han Palace Building: Constructed above the ruins of Southern Han Palace Hall Two, this pavilion maintains the integrity and authenticity of the historical remains. Visitors descend to an underground level to view the original palace foundations.
- Exhibition Building: Hosts permanent displays including "Palace of the Nanyue Kingdom", "The Palace of the Nanhan Kingdom", and "Guangzhou: a City with Two-thousand-year History and Rich Culture" showcasing significant artifacts from both the Nanyue and Southern Han kingdoms.
- Ancient Wells Building: Highlights representative wells discovered within the palace complex through a semi-subterranean protective canopy. This space interprets Guangzhou's ancient well culture while preserving the archaeological context in situ.
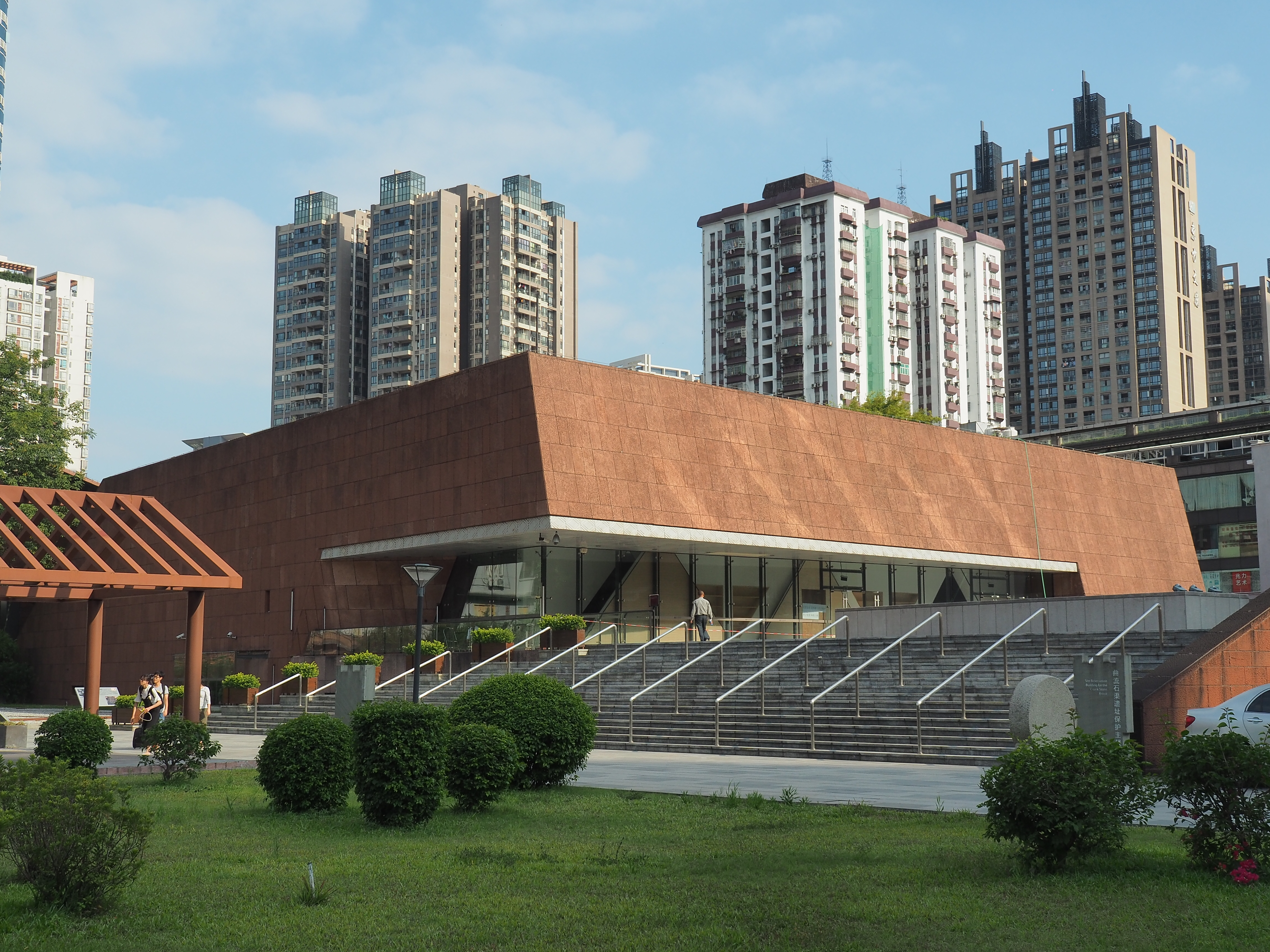
Exterior of the Nanyue Palace Garden Building

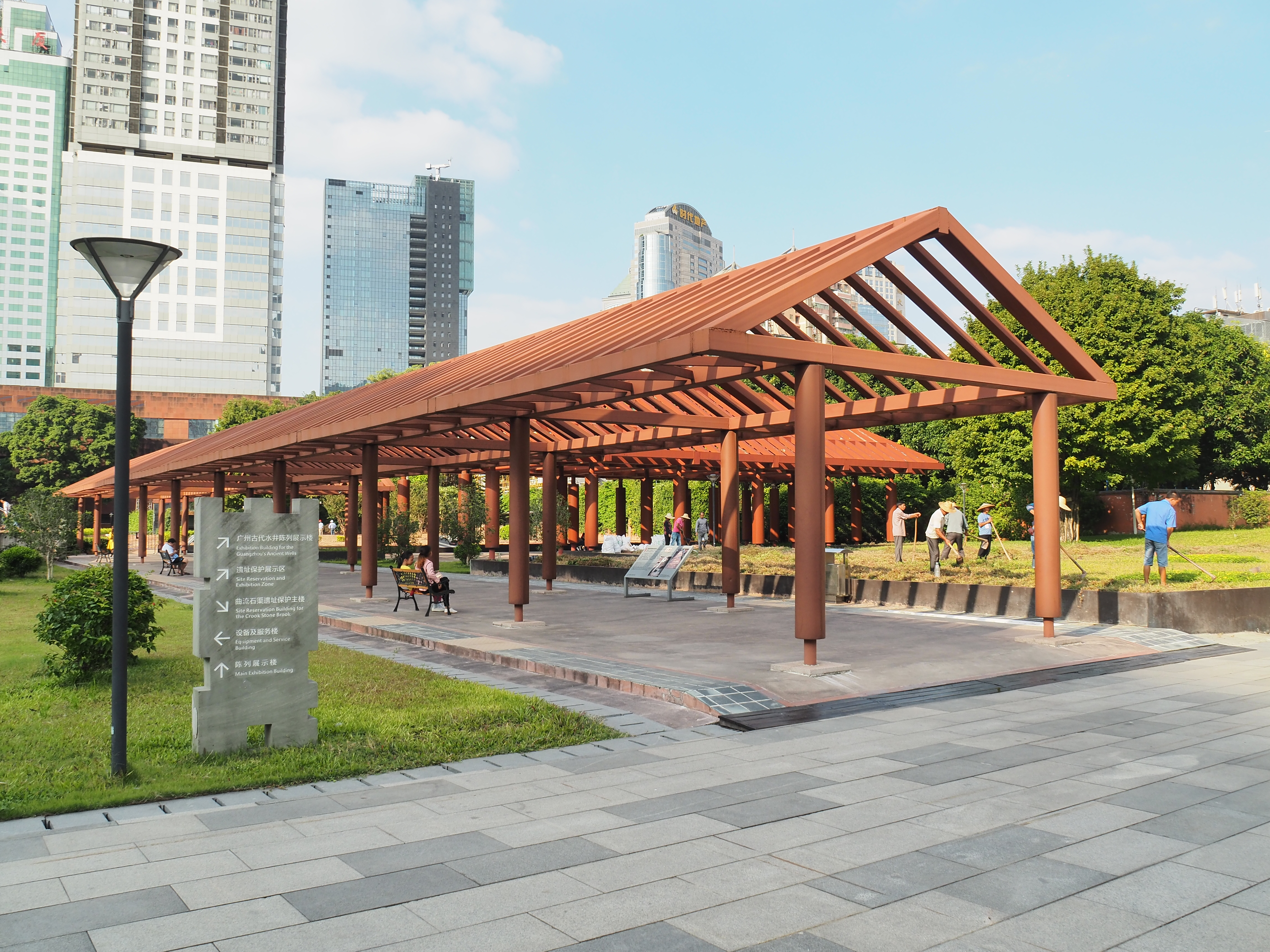
Simulation of palace corridors

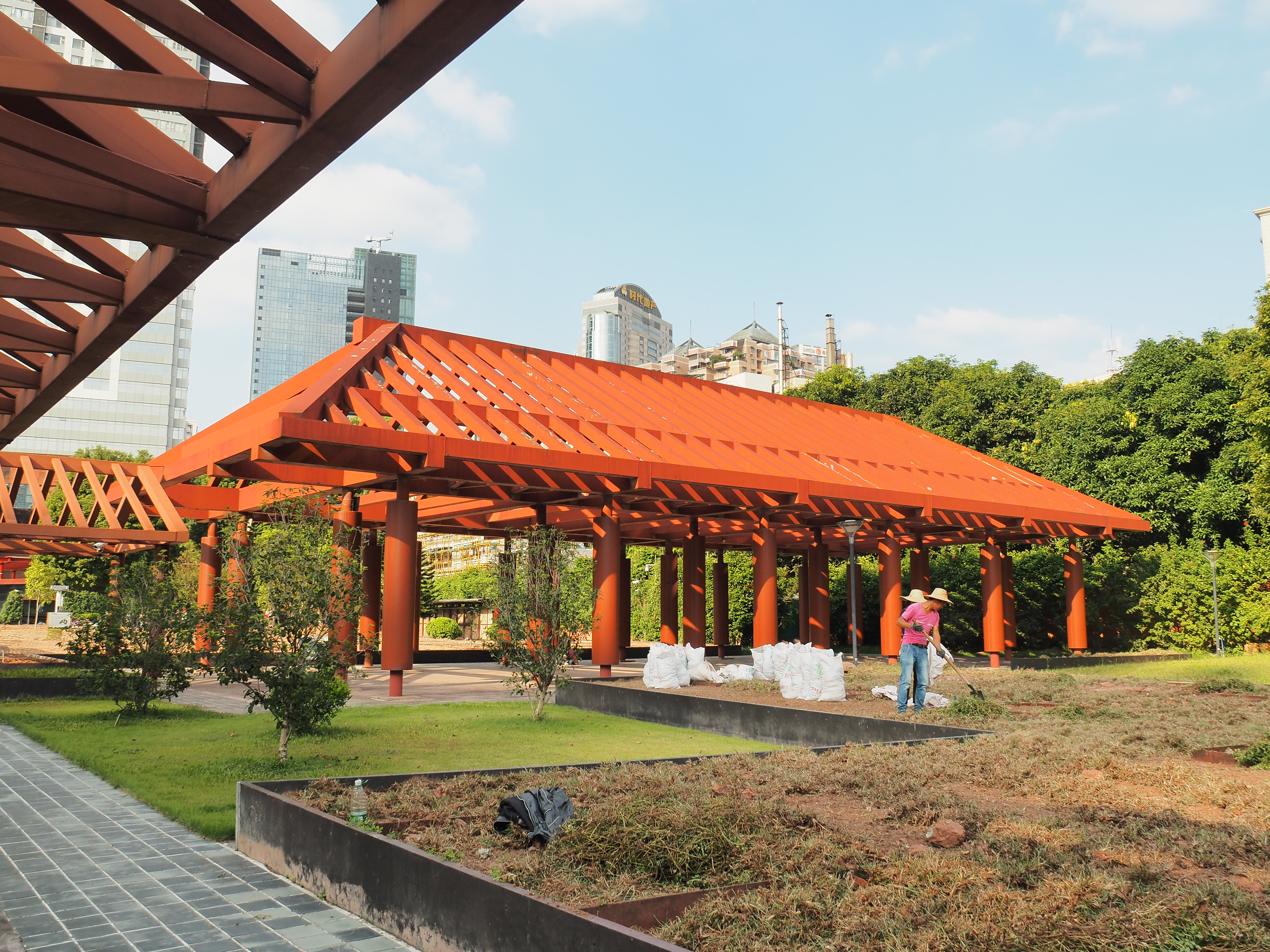
Simulation of palace corridors

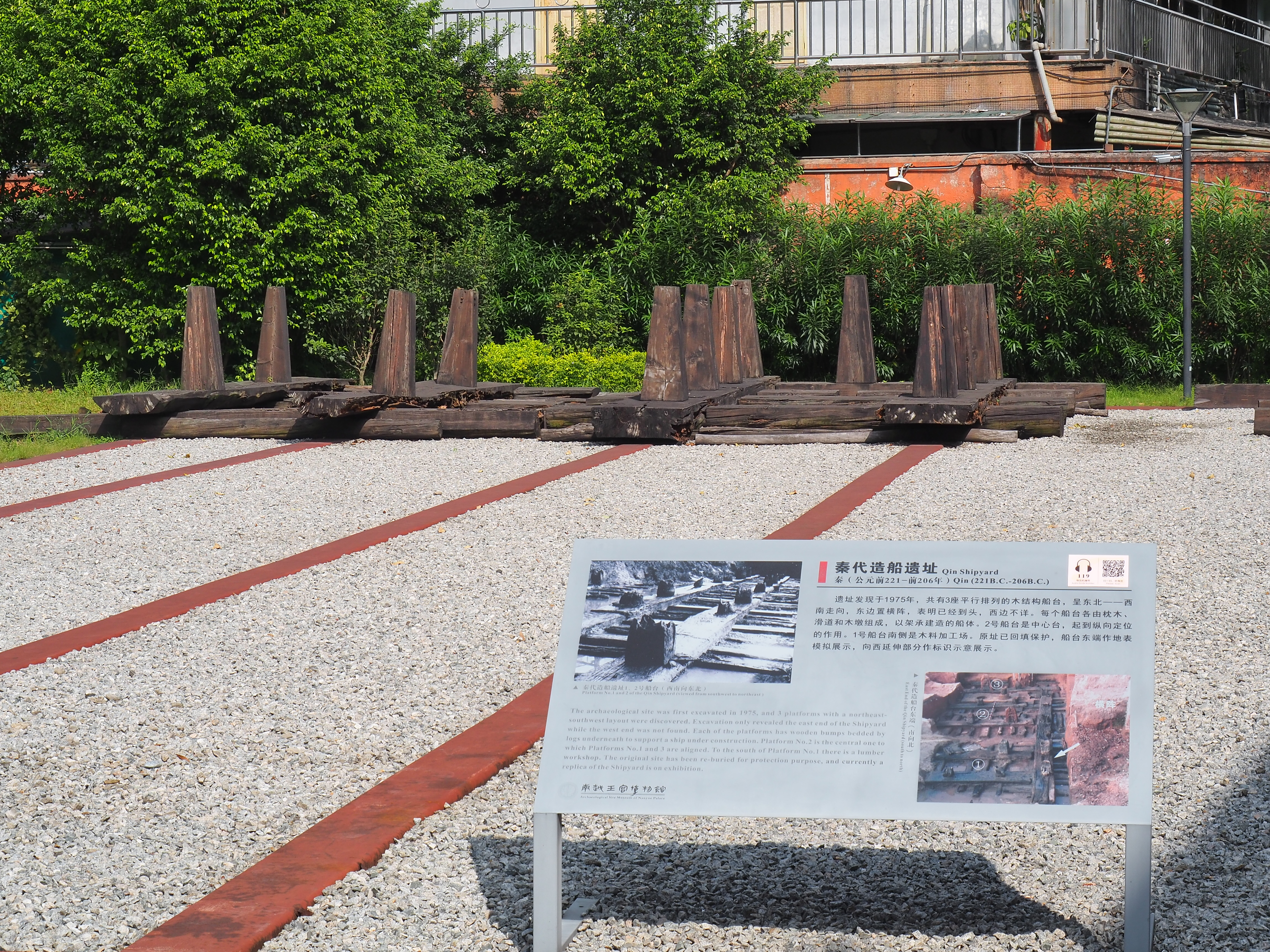
Ruin of Qin Dynasty Shipyard

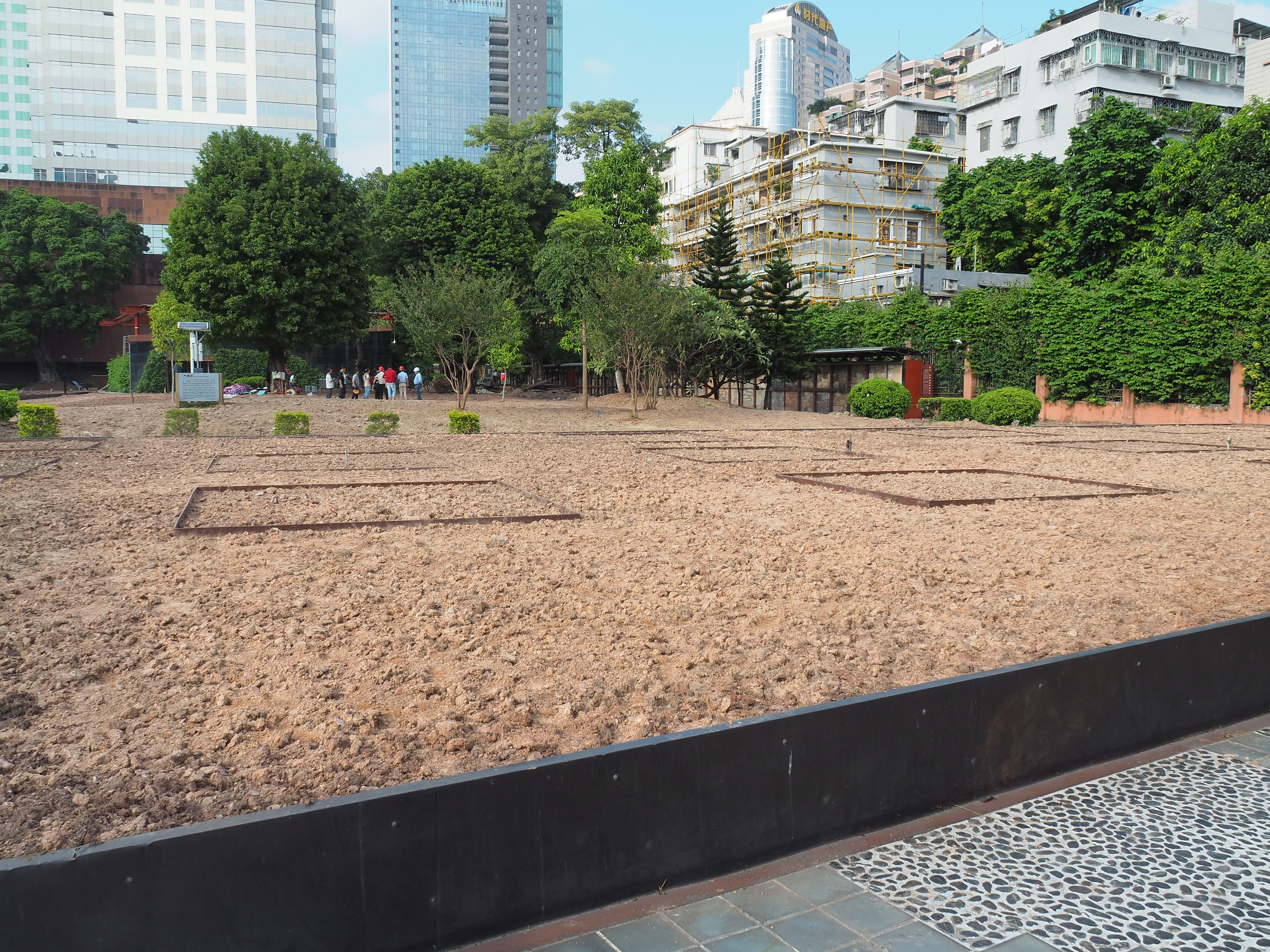
Ground covering the ruin of Nanyue Palace Hall One

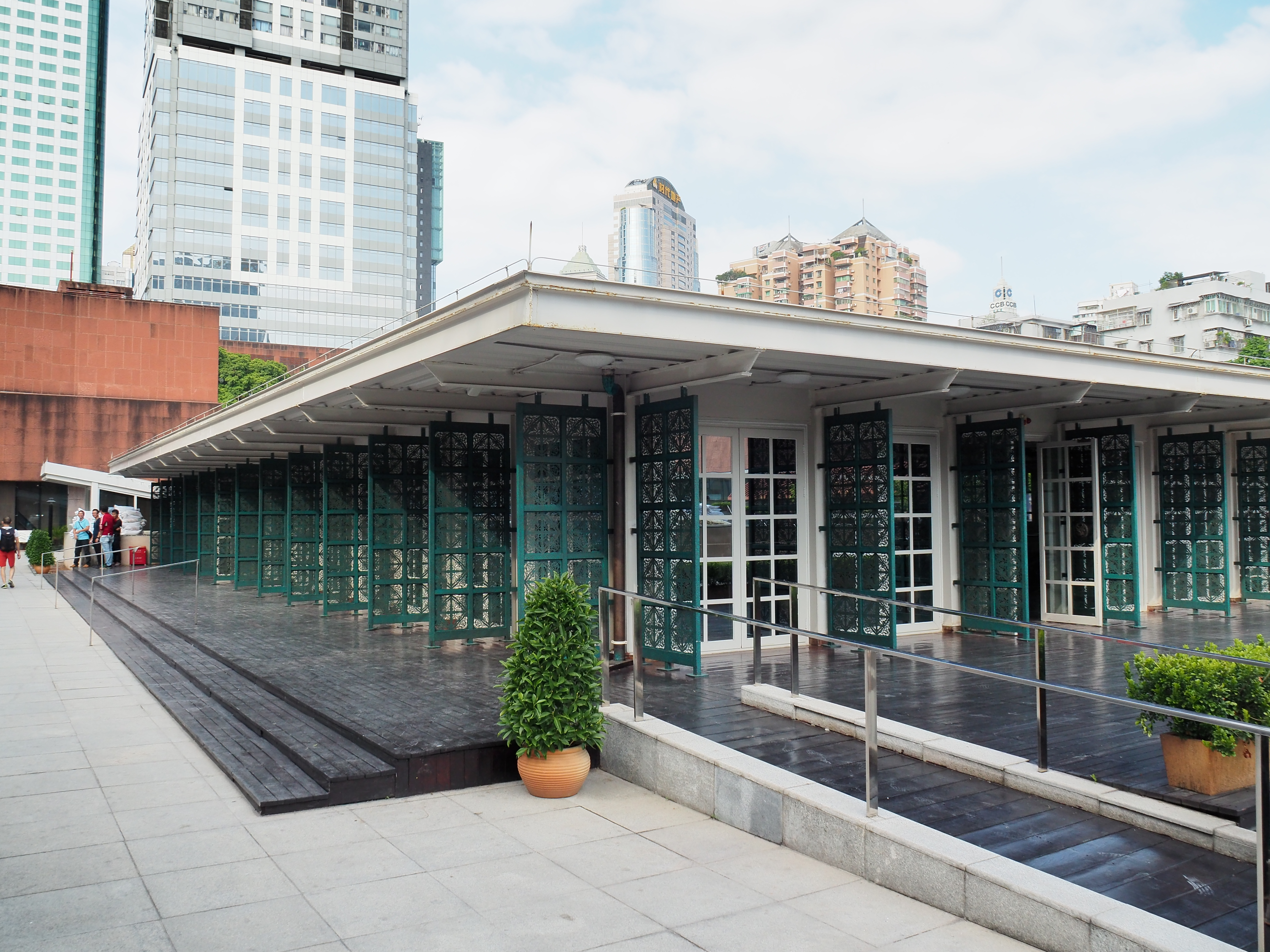
Exterior of the Southern Han Palace Building

== Exhibitions and Artifacts ==
=== Southern Territory of Qin and Han Dynasties (Site of King's Tomb) ===
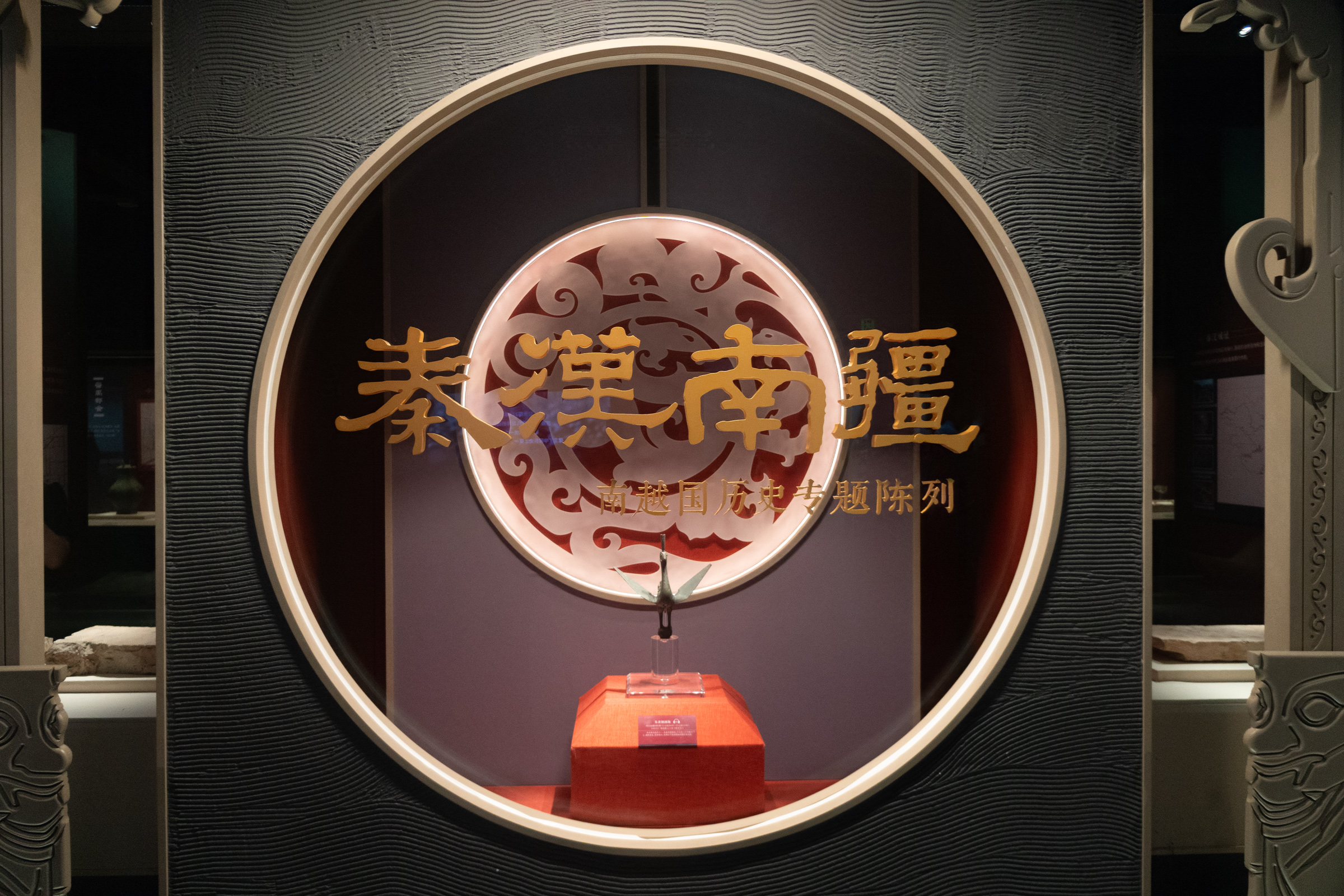
Exhibition "Southern Territory of Qin and Han Dynasties"

The exhibition "Southern Territory of Qin and Han Dynasties" displays the cultural relics unearthed from the sites and tombs of the Qin and Han periods, especially those of the Nanyue Kingdom in Guangdong and Guangxi. It chronicles the history of the Nanyue Kingdom, tracing the Lingnan region's evolution from tribal societies to conquest by the Qin Empire. It explores the kingdom's period of relatively autonomous development before its reintegration into the Han dynasty, ultimately integrated into the pluralistic and integrated Chinese culture.

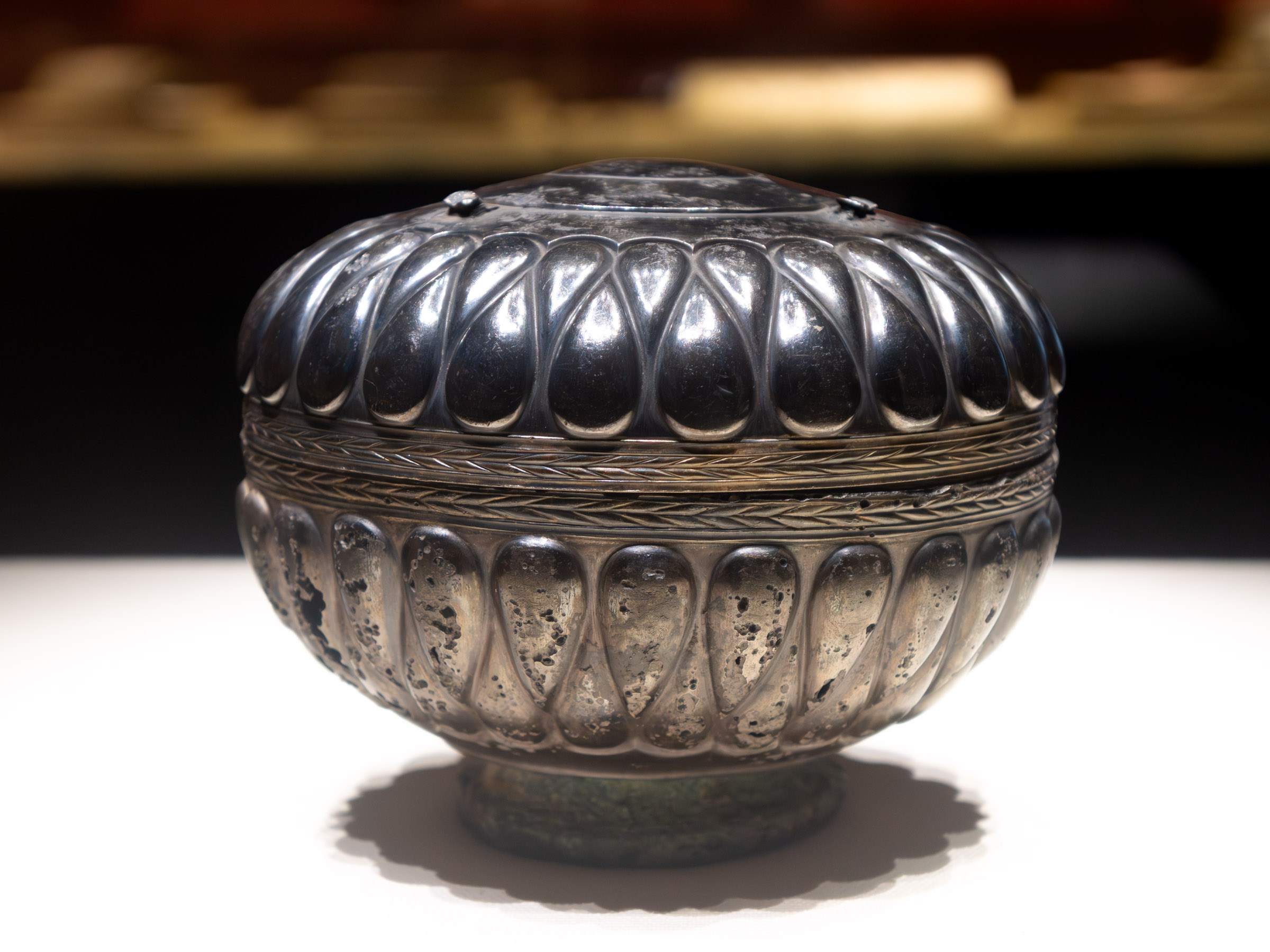
Silver Box with embossed petal motif

This exhibition incorporates selected artifacts excavated from both the Site of King's Tomb and the Site of Palace and Garden, including:

- Emperor's Jade Seal: The seal was found on the body of the tomb occupant in the Nanyue King's Tomb. It measures 2.3 cm in side length and features a chi-dragon knob. Its inscription—"帝印" (Imperial Seal) carved in incised carved seal script—provides concrete evidence of the historical event where Zhao Tuo and his successors declared themselves emperors.
- "Taizi" Gold Seal with Turtle Knob: It was discovered within a lacquer box beside the tomb occupant. This rectangular seal (2.6 cm × 2.4 cm) stands 0.5 cm high at the base and 1.5 cm including the turtle knob, weighing 74.7 grams. Its incised carved small seal script inscription "泰子" (where "泰" is interchangeable with "太", meaning Crown Prince) was accompanied by a jade "Taizi" seal. Scholarly debate suggests both seals originally belonged to Zhao Mo's father—Zhao Tuo's heir who died before ascending the throne—and were inherited by Zhao Mo for burial.
- "Yong Xiang Ling" Bronze Seal: This fish-knob bronze seal bearing the inscription "景巷令印" (Seal of the Yongxiang Official) was recovered from a sacrificial victim in the tomb's eastern front chamber. Here, "景" functions as a variant character for "永", confirming the title "Yongxiang Ling" (永巷令), a role denoting the supervisor of the imperial household responsible for palace management.
- "Huayin Palace" Inscribed Lid Fragment: This fragmentary lid inscribed "华音宫" (Huayin Palace) was excavated at the Nanyue Palace ruins. Absent from historical records, this name signifies a palace uniquely designated by the Nanyue Kingdom, reflecting its autonomous administrative practices.
- Silver Box: The Silver Box with embossed petal motif was discovered in the foot compartment of the inner coffin within the Nanyue King's Tomb. Measuring 12.1 cm in height and 14.8 cm in diameter at its widest point, this artifact weighs 572.6 grams. Both the box and its lid are crafted from silver, forming a flattened spherical shape when closed. Its defining feature is a series of opposing, staggered garlic-head-shaped embossed patterns encircling the body and lid. These motifs were created using the repoussé technique, a method entirely distinct from traditional Chinese craftsmanship but strikingly similar to the lobed designs found on ancient West Asian gold and silverware. This technical and stylistic alignment confirms the box's origin as an overseas import, likely from the Persian or Hellenistic world. As such, this silver box stands as crucial material evidence of cultural exchange between China and Western regions during the Western Han Dynasty, reflecting early maritime trade along the Silk Road routes.
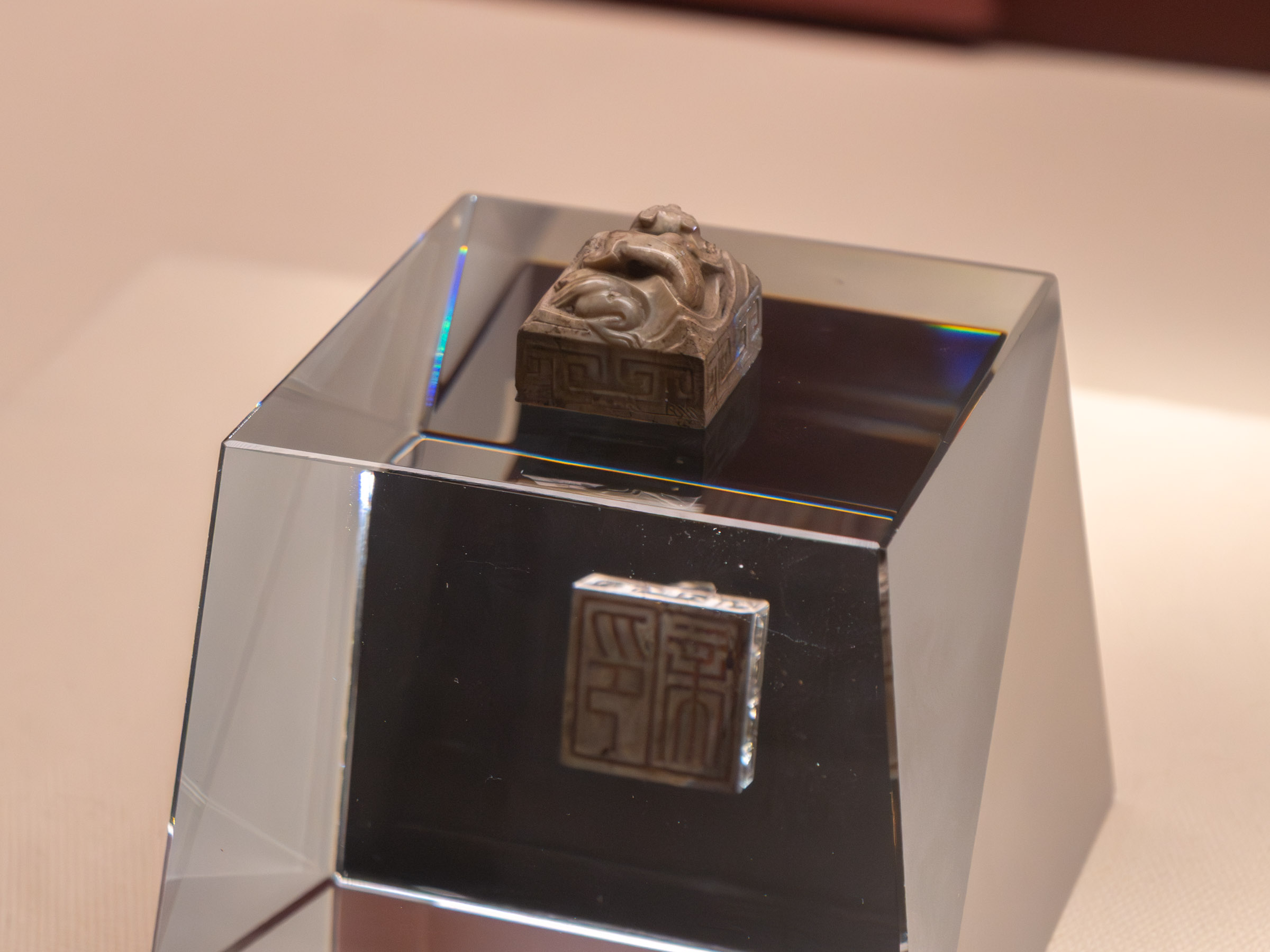
Emperor's Jade Seal

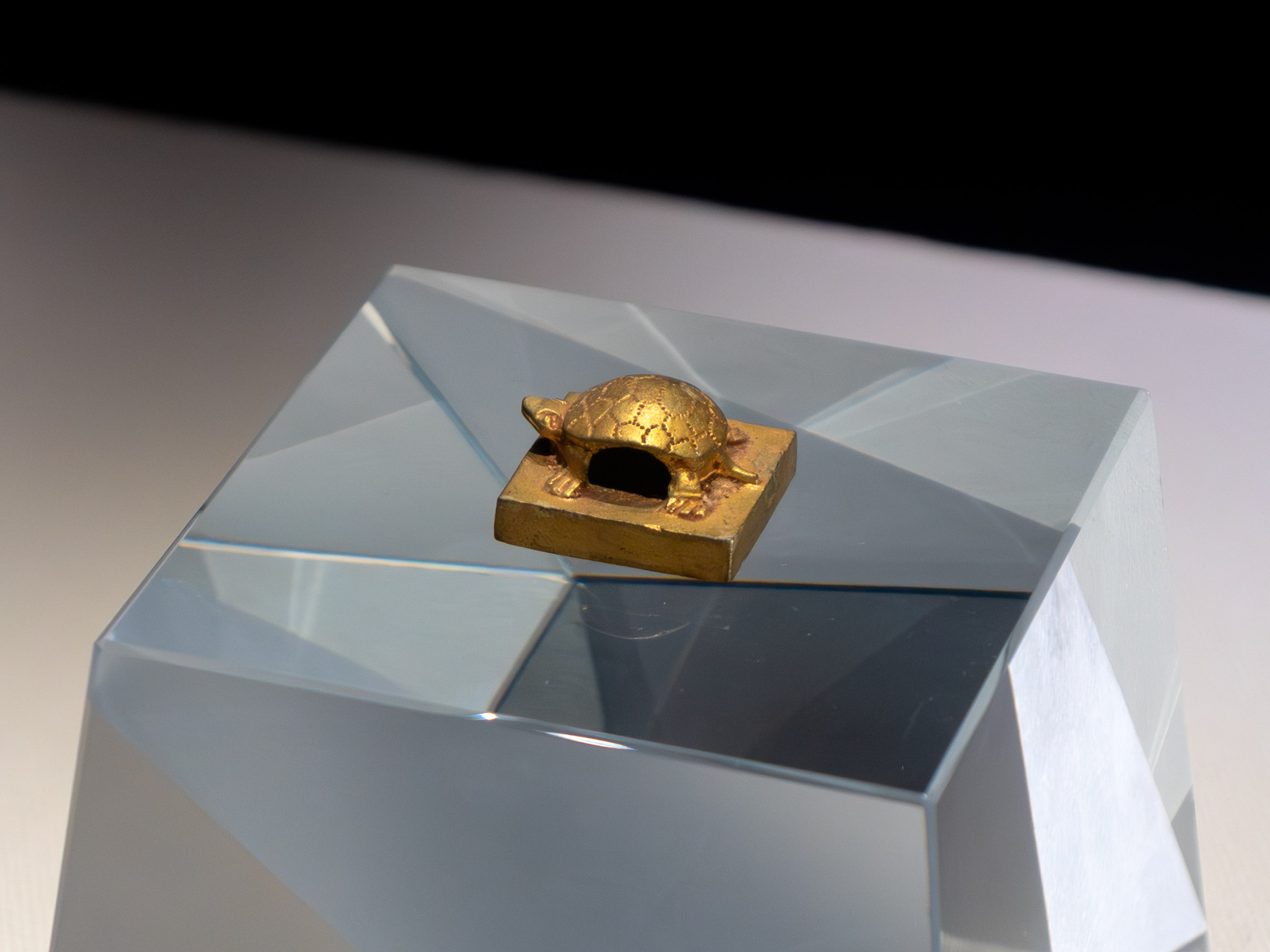
"Taizi" Gold Seal with Turtle Knob

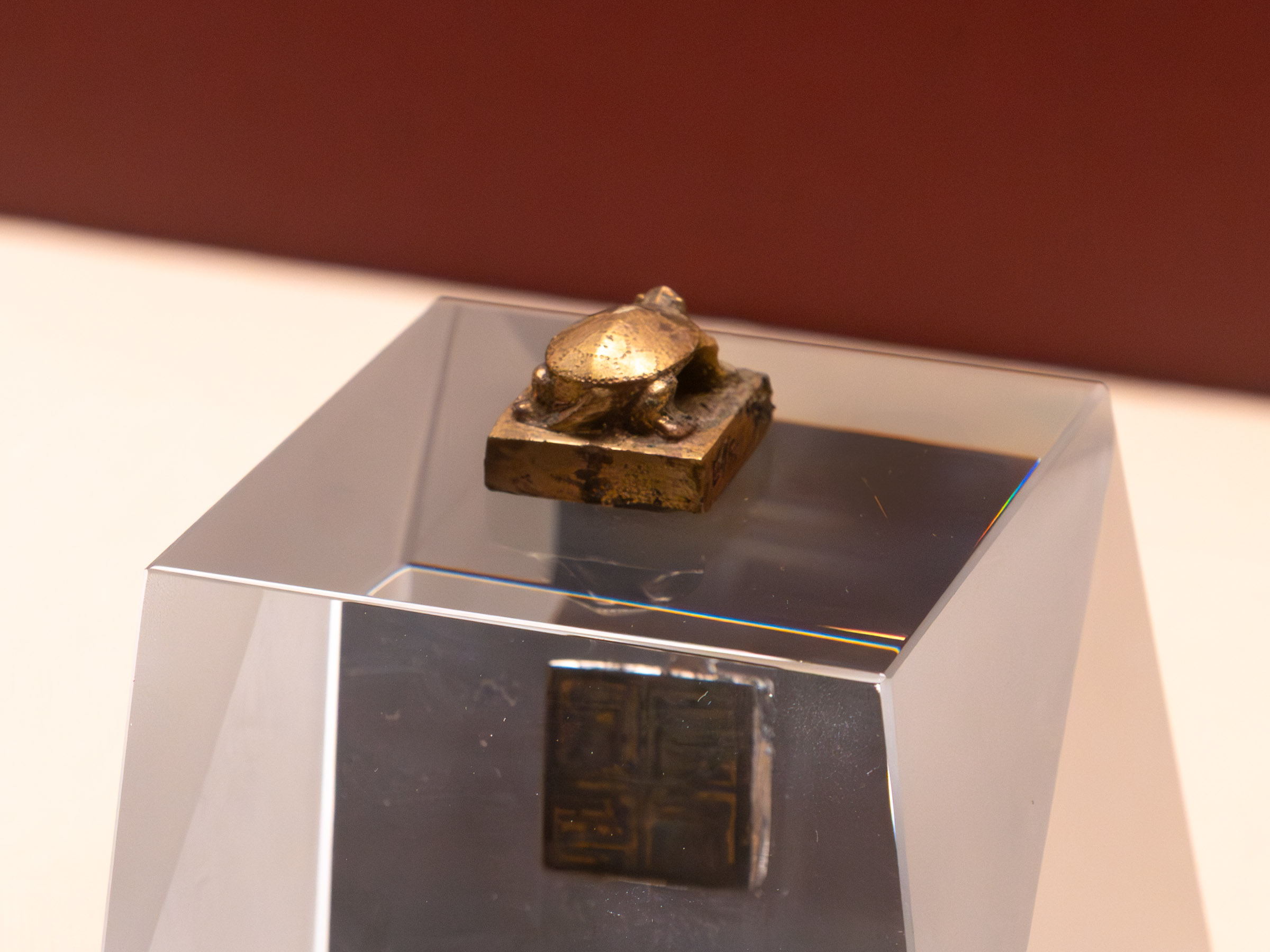
"Left Concubine" bronze seal

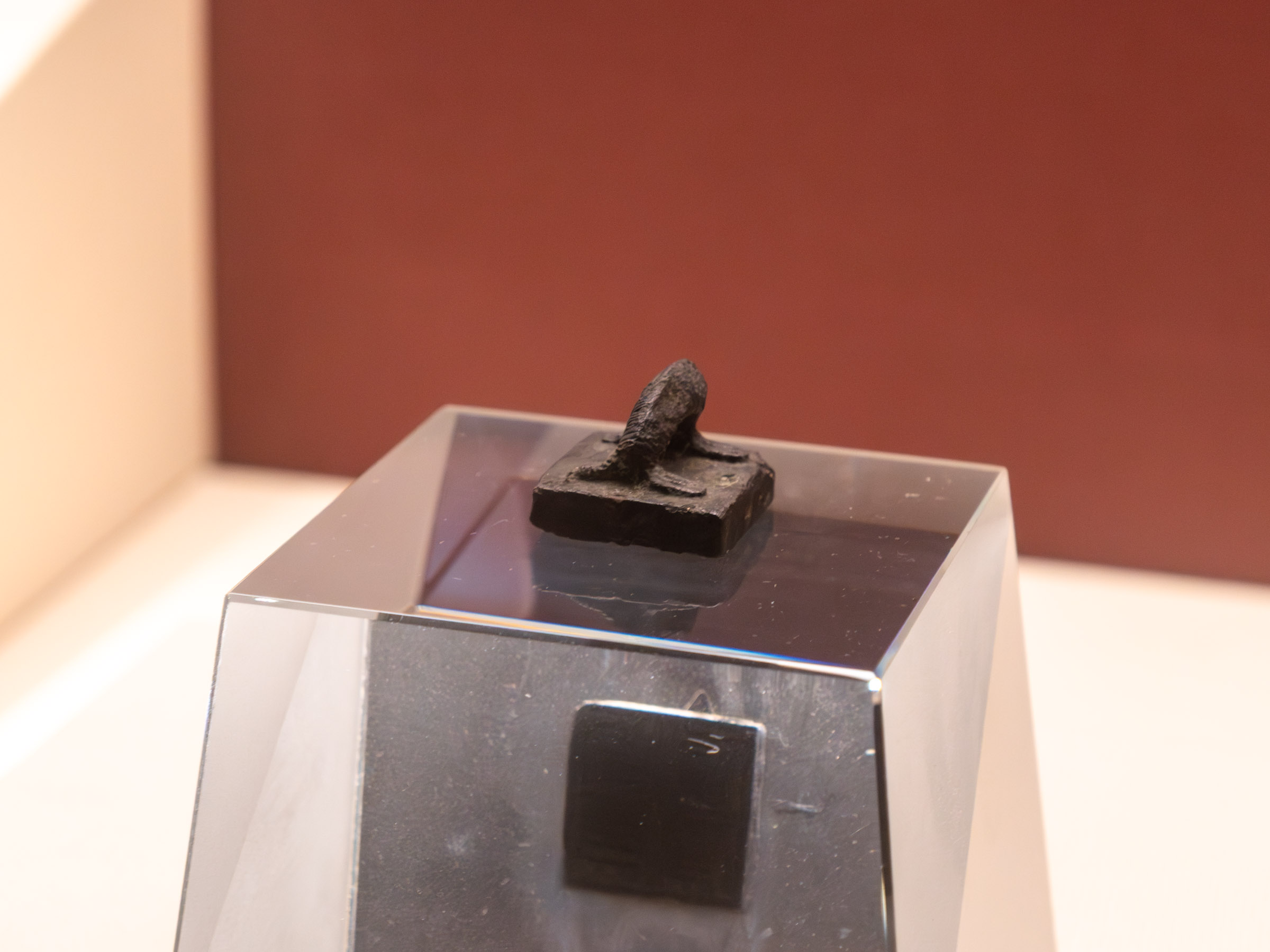
"Yong Xiang Ling" Bronze Seal

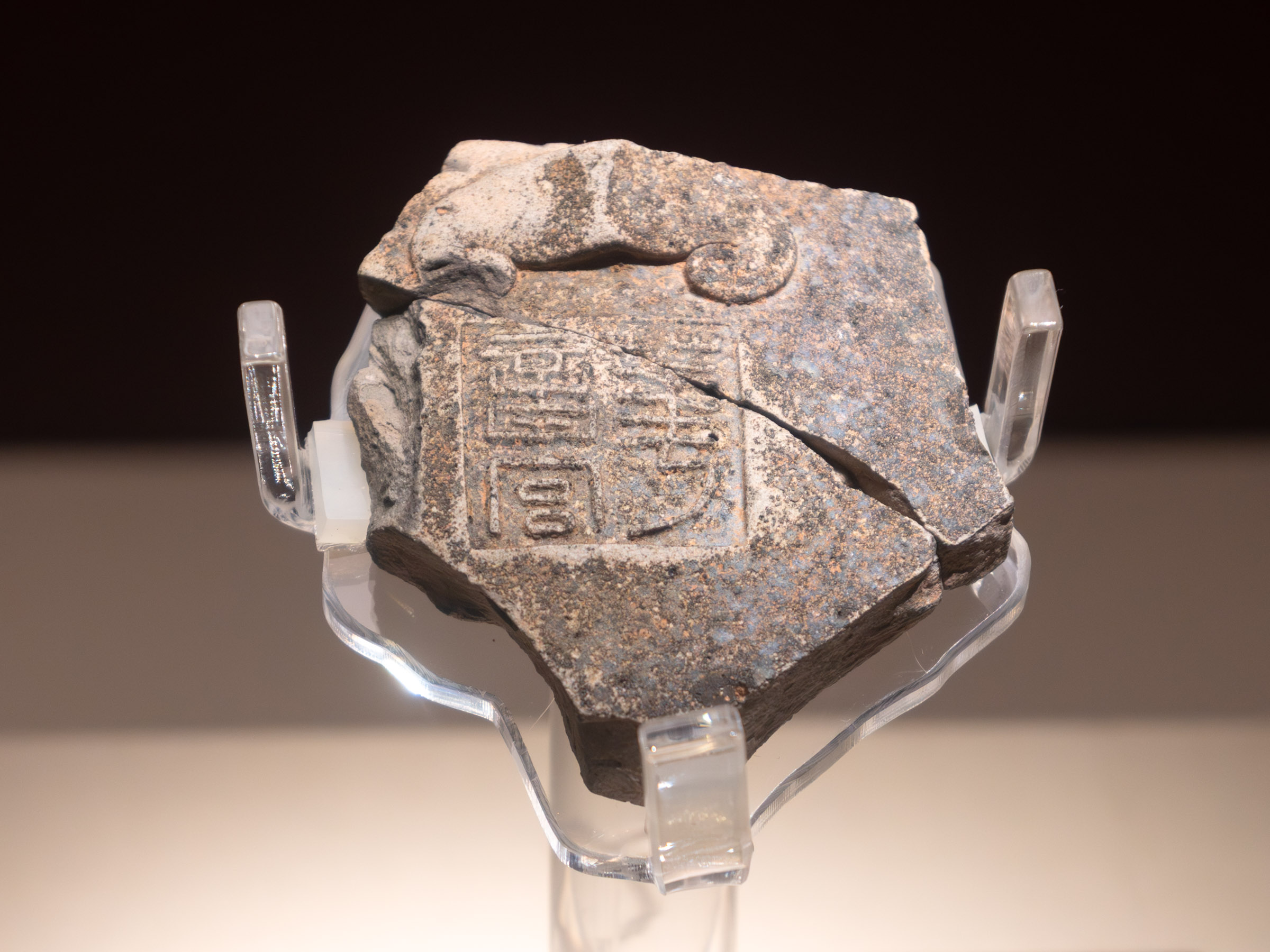
"Huayin Palace" Inscribed Lid Fragment

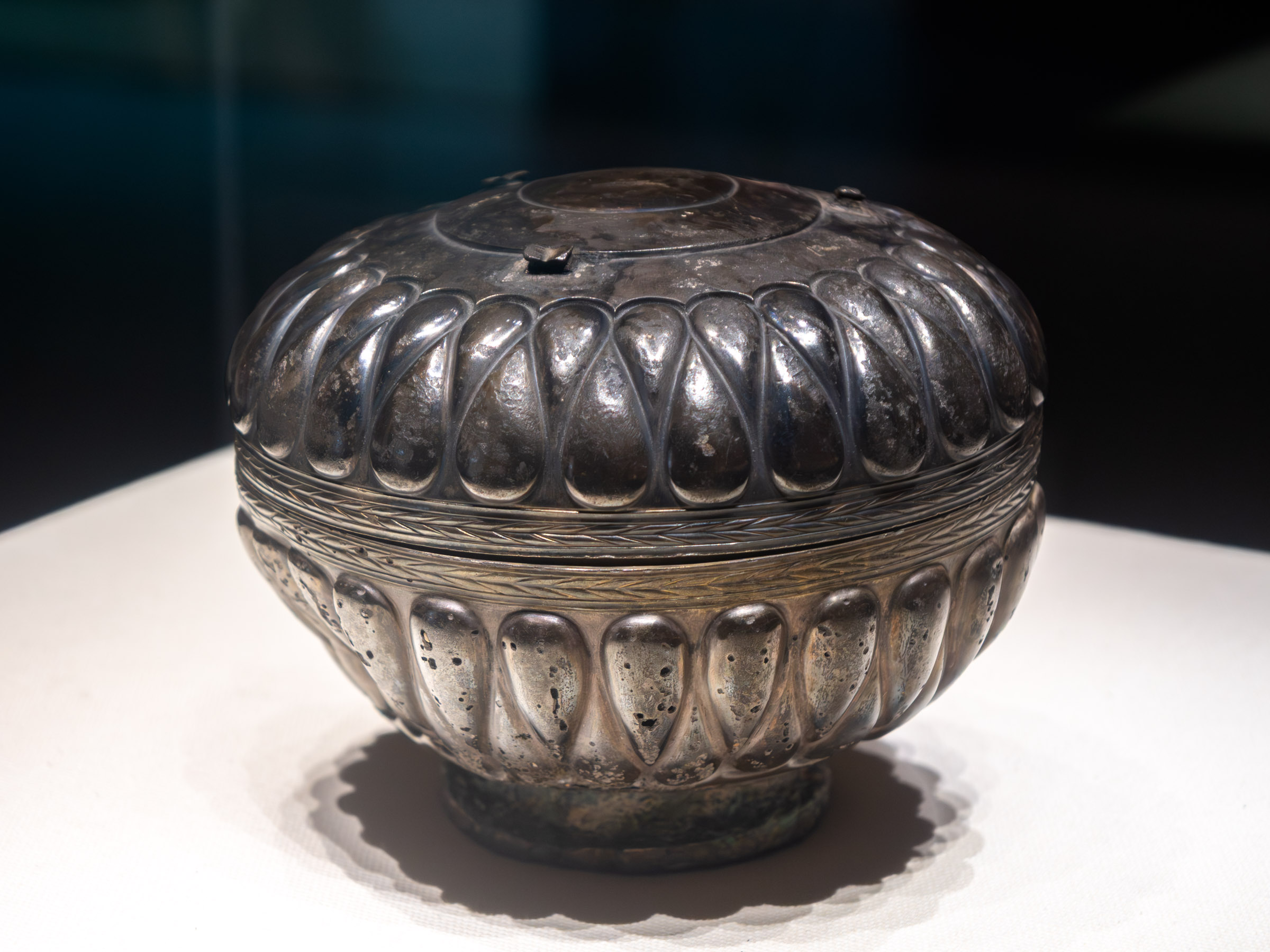
Silver Box

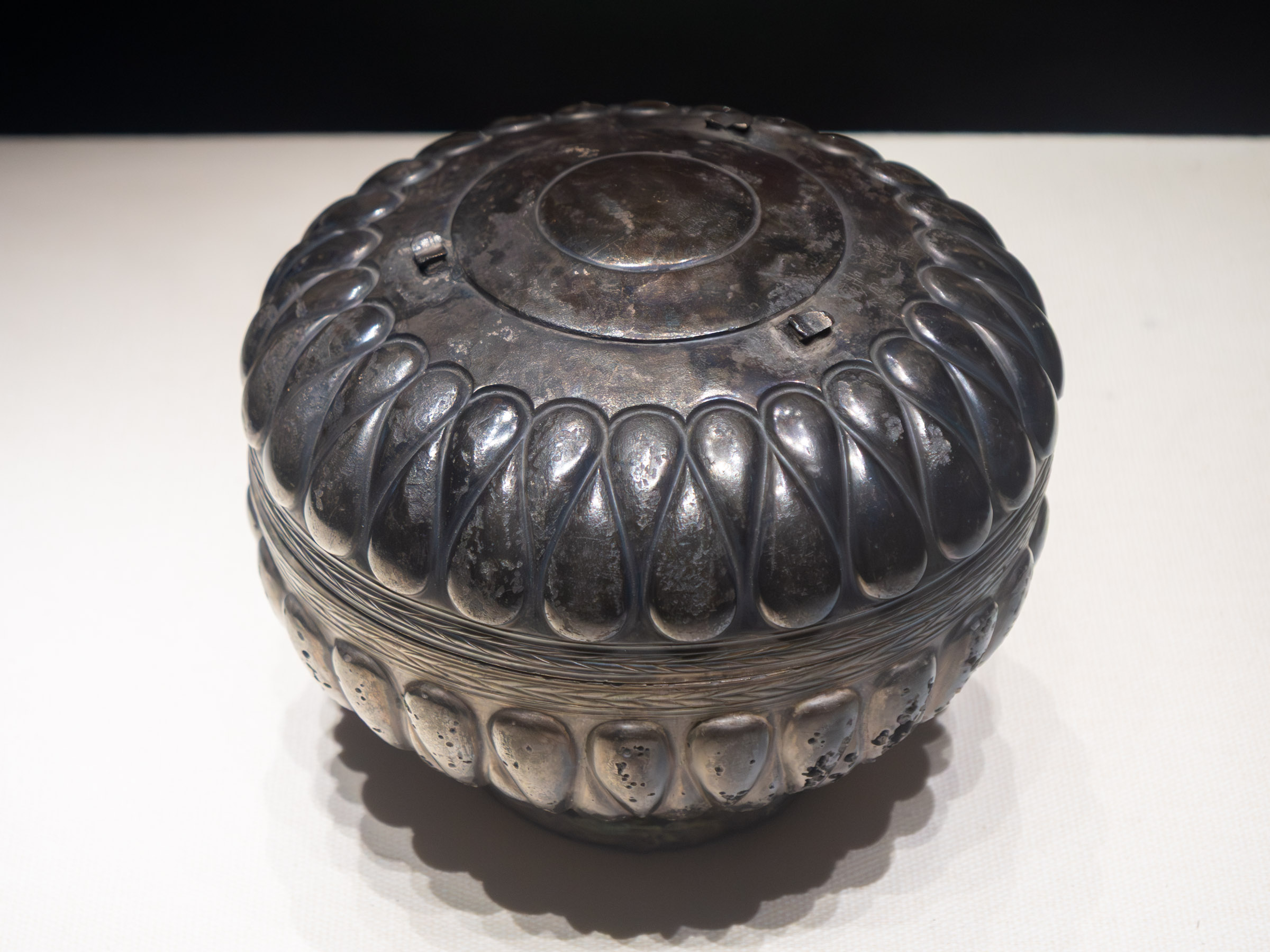
Silver Box

=== The Nanyue Treasures (Site of King's Tomb) ===
"The Nanyue Treasures - Exhibition of Unearthed Relics from Nanyue King Tomb" is the principal exhibition of the museum. It showcases a significant collection of precious artifacts excavated from the Tomb of Nanyue King, comprehensively reflecting the political, economic, and cultural landscape of Lingnan two millennia ago. It is organized into multiple sections.

==== Emperor Wen of the Nanyue Kingdom ====
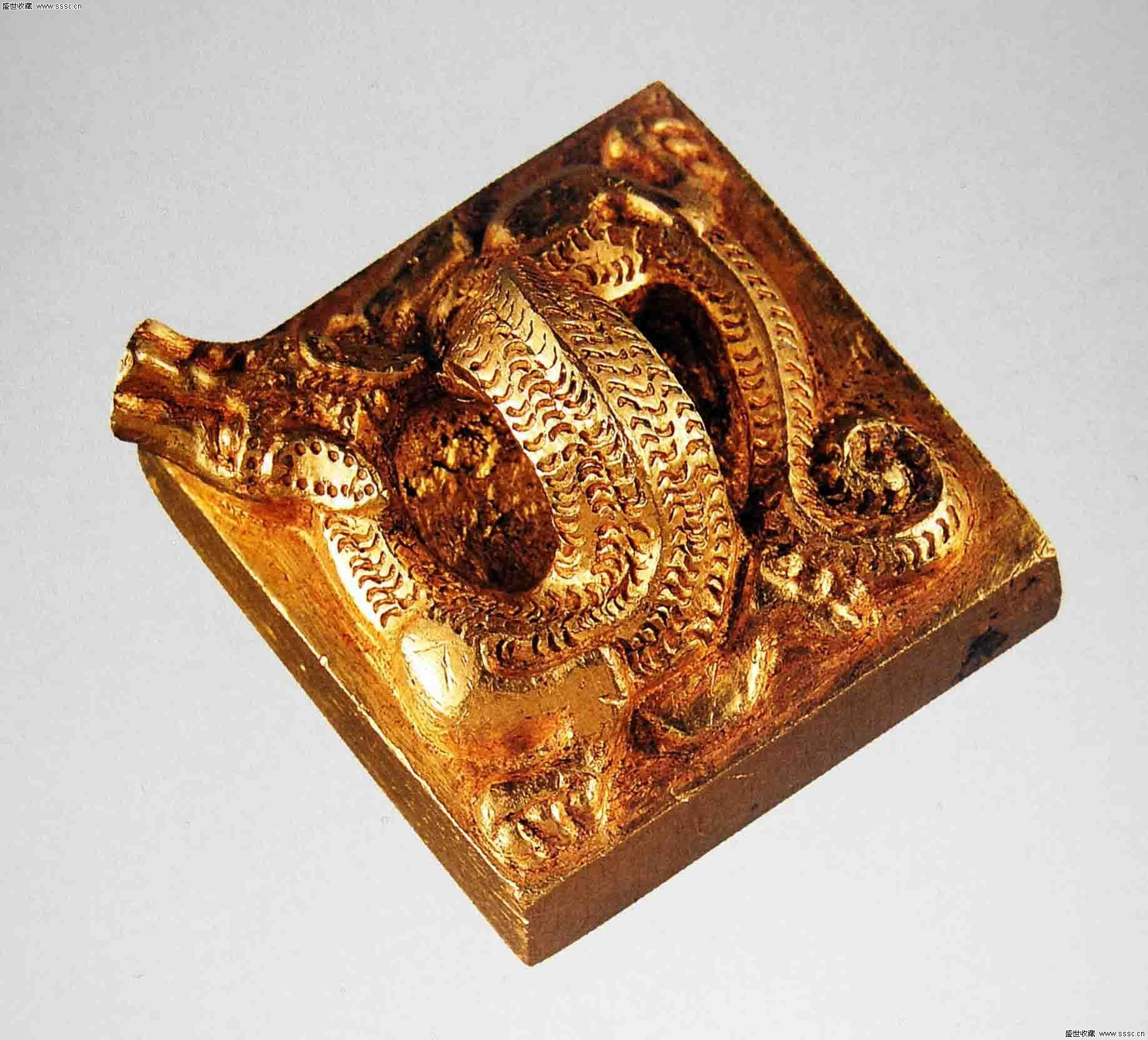
The Administrative Seal of Emperor Wen

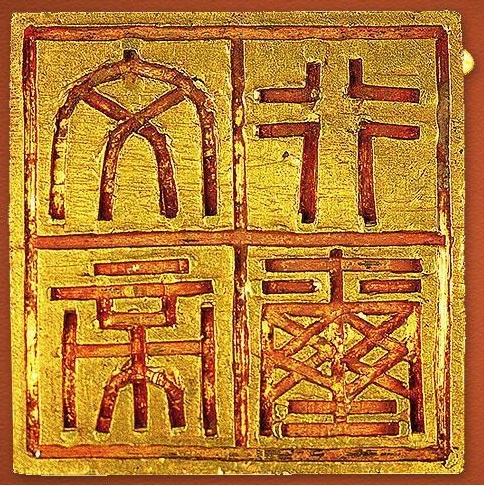
Carving of the Administrative Seal of Emperor Wen

This section showcases multiple items closely related to the identity of Zhao Mo, the second ruler of Nanyue:

- Administrative Seal of Emperor Wen: Also known as Gold Seal with Dragon Knob, this gold seal was discovered positioned over the chest of the tomb occupant. Measuring 3.1 cm in length, 3 cm in width, and standing 1.8 cm high (including knob), this 148.5-gram seal boasts a 98% pure gold composition. Its knob takes the form of a coiled dragon arched into an S-shape, with the creature's raised back designed to accommodate a silk ribbon for suspension. The seal face bears a incised carved inscription of four seal-script characters: "文帝行玺" (Administrative Seal of Emperor Wen). This inscription serves as irrefutable proof identifying the tomb's occupant as Zhao Mo, the second ruler of the Nanyue Kingdom. The Administrative Seal of Emperor Wen is the largest extant Western Han gold seal discovered in China and the only known Han-period imperial seal featuring a dragon-shaped knob by far. Its historical significance makes it as one of the crown jewels of the Nanyue King Museum.
- Gold Seal of "the Right Concubine": Unearthed in the eastern annex chamber where four concubines were interred as sacrificial victims, this square seal (2.2 cm × 2.2 cm) features a turtle-shaped knob and stands 1.6 cm high overall, weighing 65 grams. Significantly, while the seals of the other three Concubines were bronze, this gold seal bears the designation "玺" (imperial seal)—a clear indicator of the Right Concubine’s elevated status as the chief concubine among the royal concubines.
- Sealing Clay of "Seal of the Emperor": Two fragments of sealing clay stamped with the characters "帝印" (Seal of the Emperor) were discovered in the western side chamber. Both measure smaller than the "Emperor's Jade Seal", confirming that Zhao Mo possessed at least two imperial seals during his lifetime. These artifacts provide further evidence of the Nanyue king's audacious act of usurping the imperial title.
- Jade Seal of "Zhao Mo": This personal name seal of the tomb occupant measures 2.3 cm square and features a truncated pyramidal knob. Its incised carved seal script inscription "赵眜" (Zhao Mo) conclusively identifies the second Nanyue king.
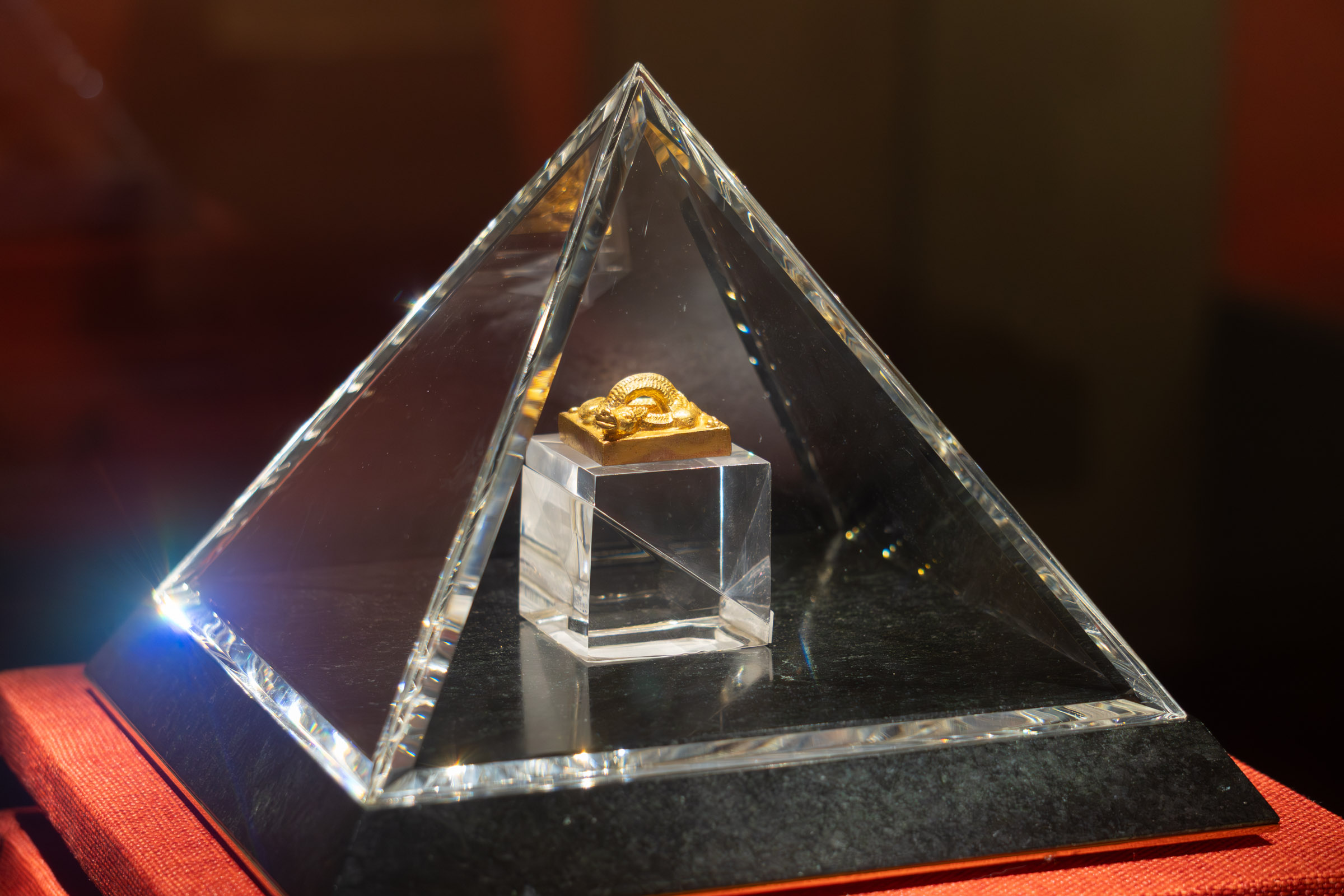
Gold Seal with Dragon Knob

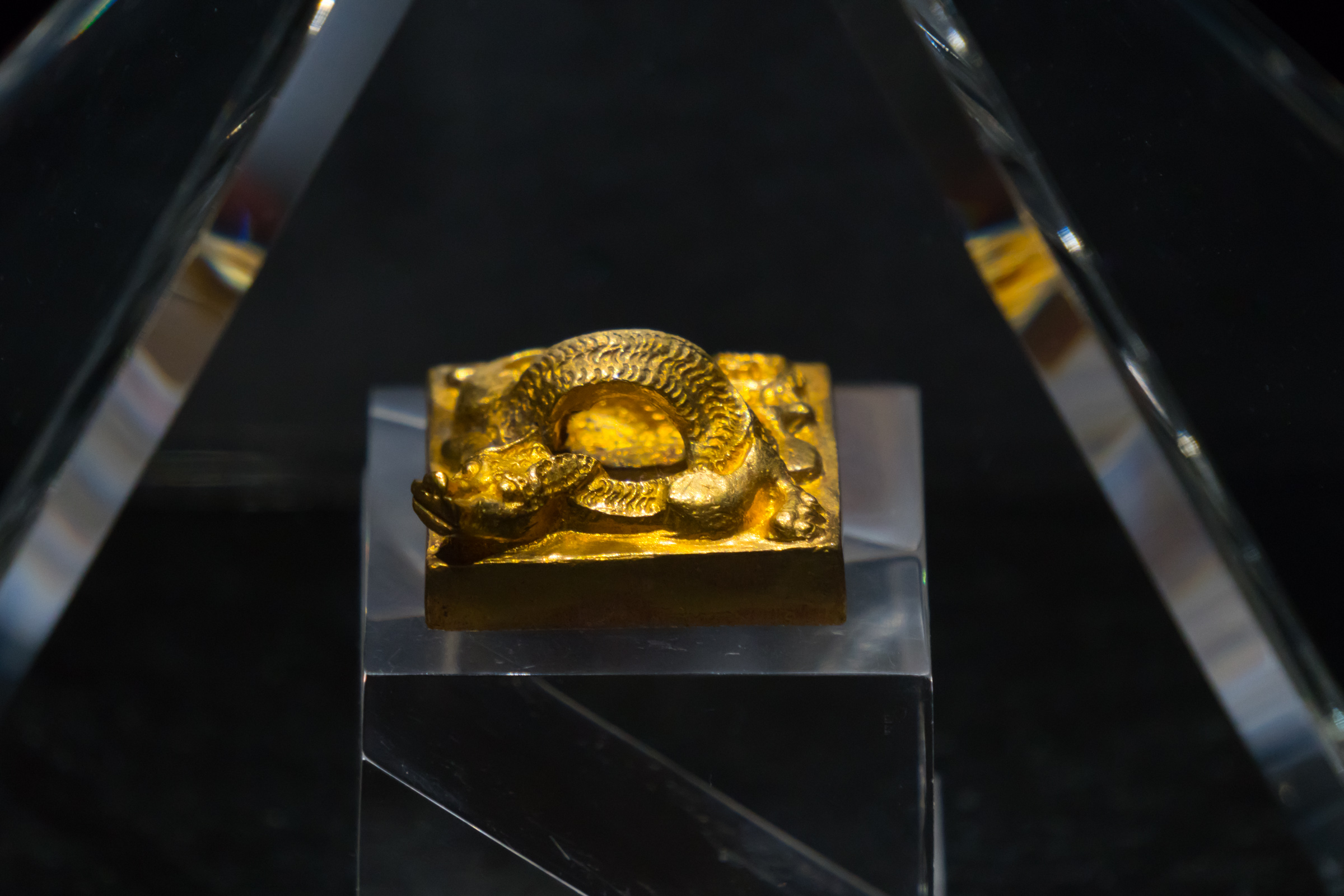
Gold Seal with Dragon Knob

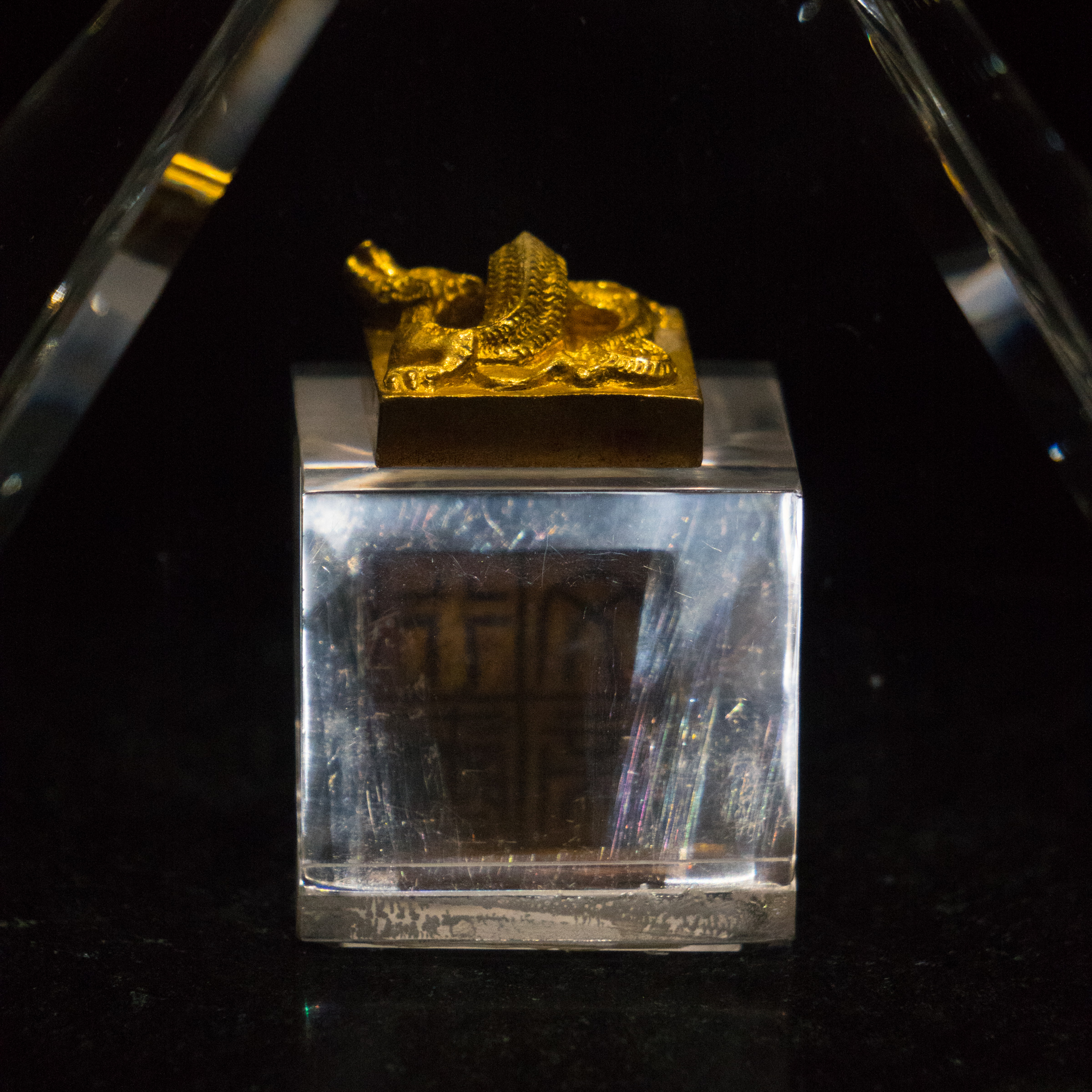
Gold Seal with Dragon Knob

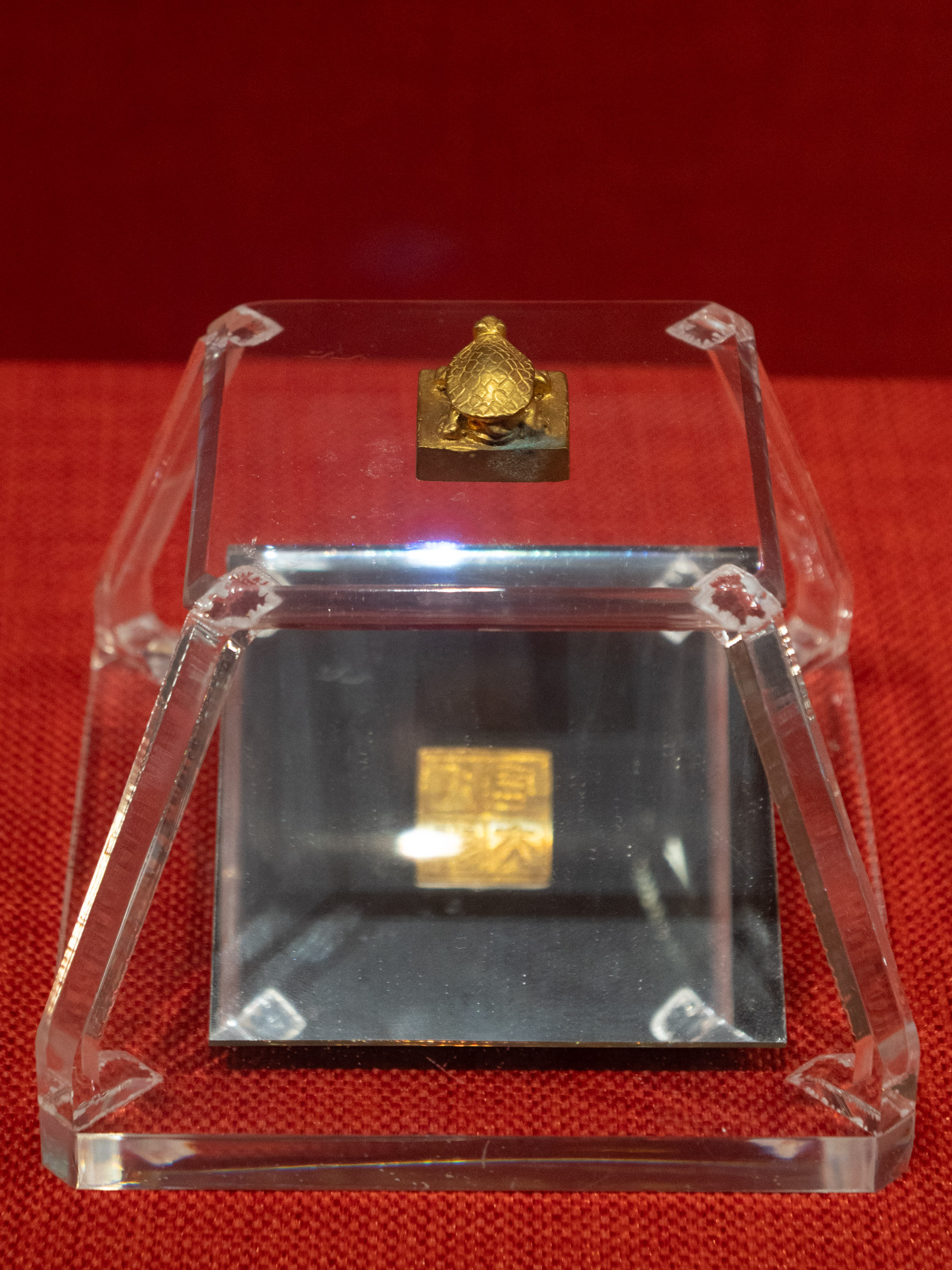
Gold Seal of "the Right Concubine"

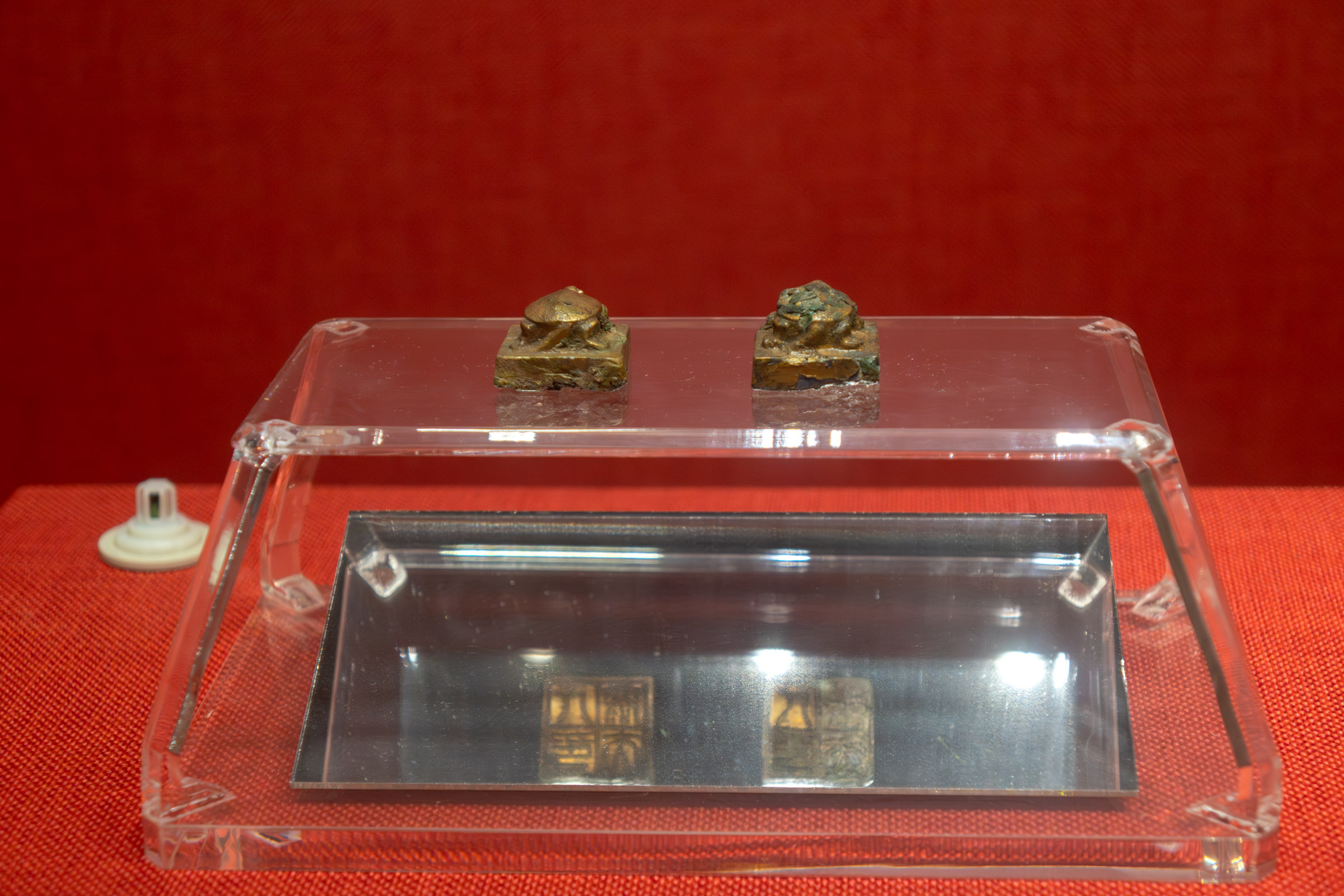
Bronze seals of other concubines

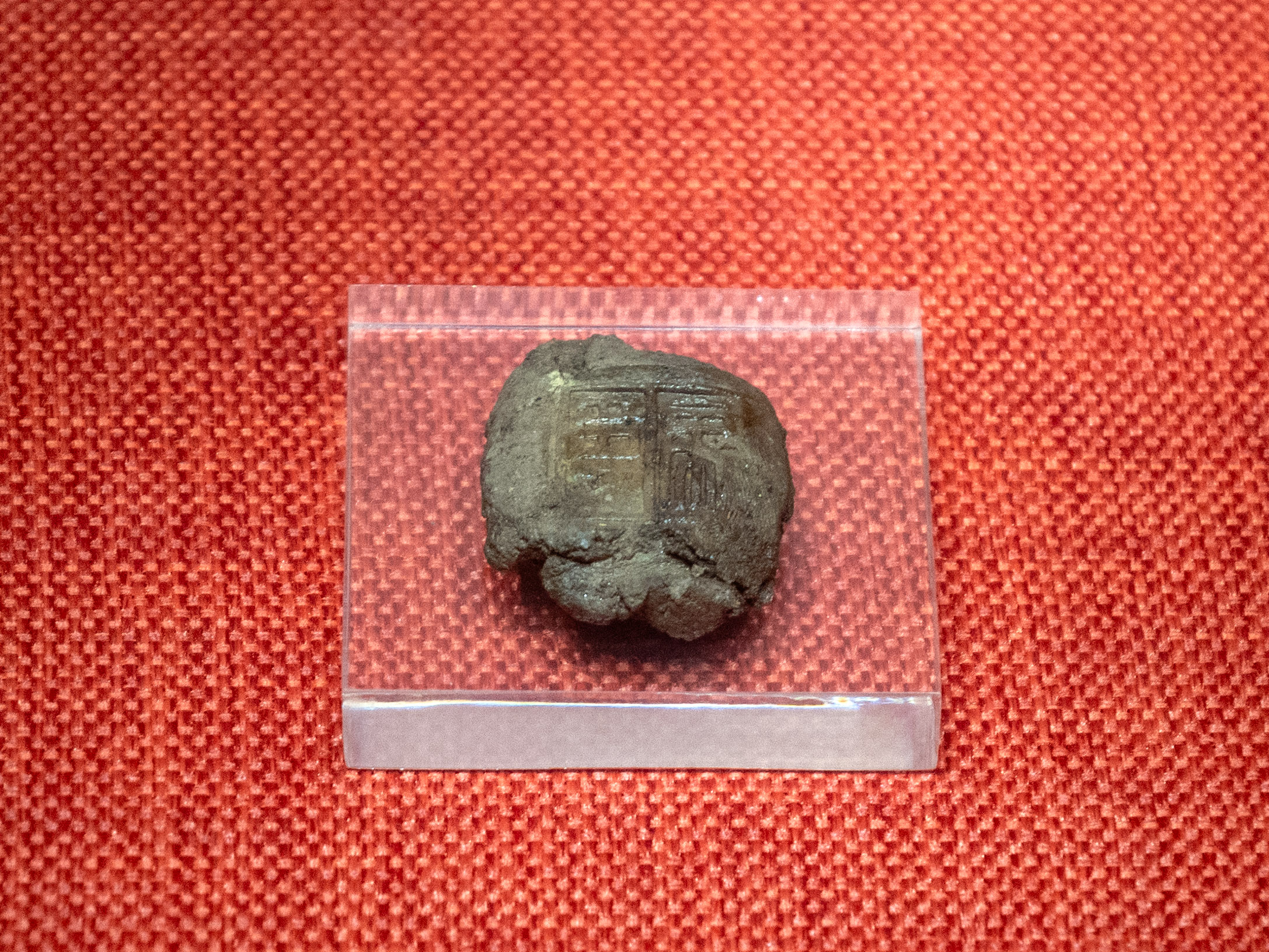
Sealing Clay of "Seal of the Emperor"

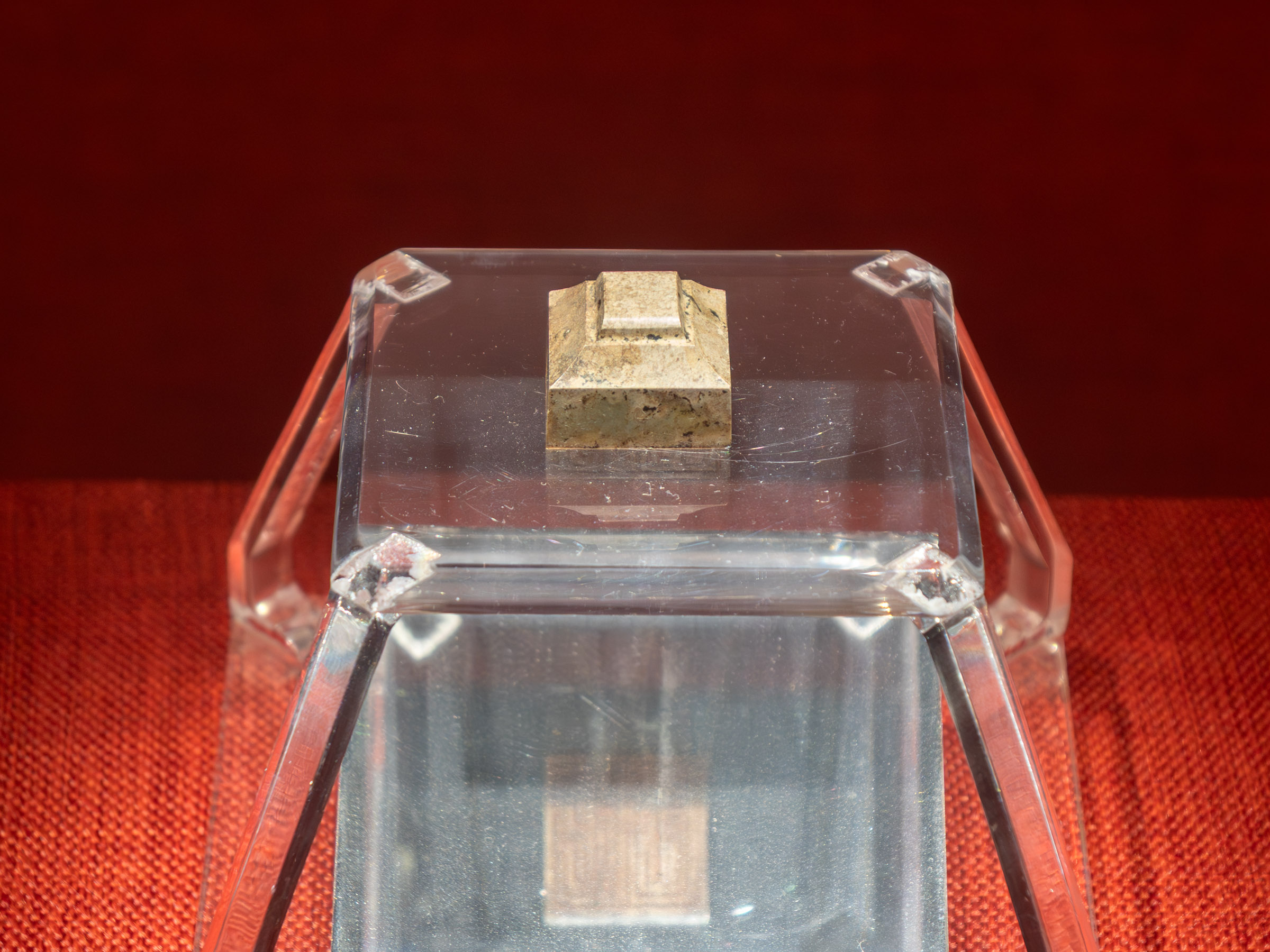
Jade Seal of "Zhao Mo"

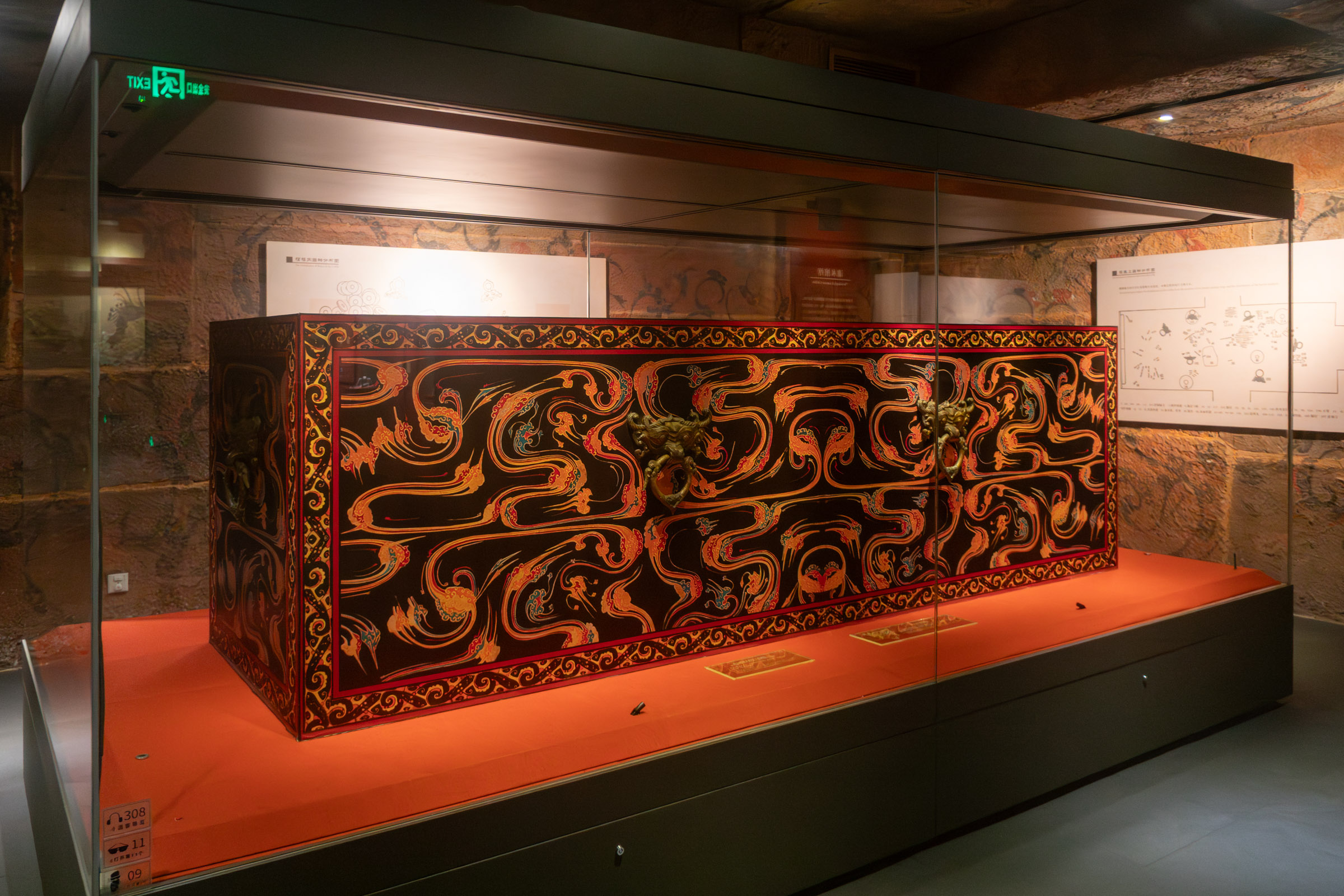
Reconstructed model of Zhao Mo's Coffin

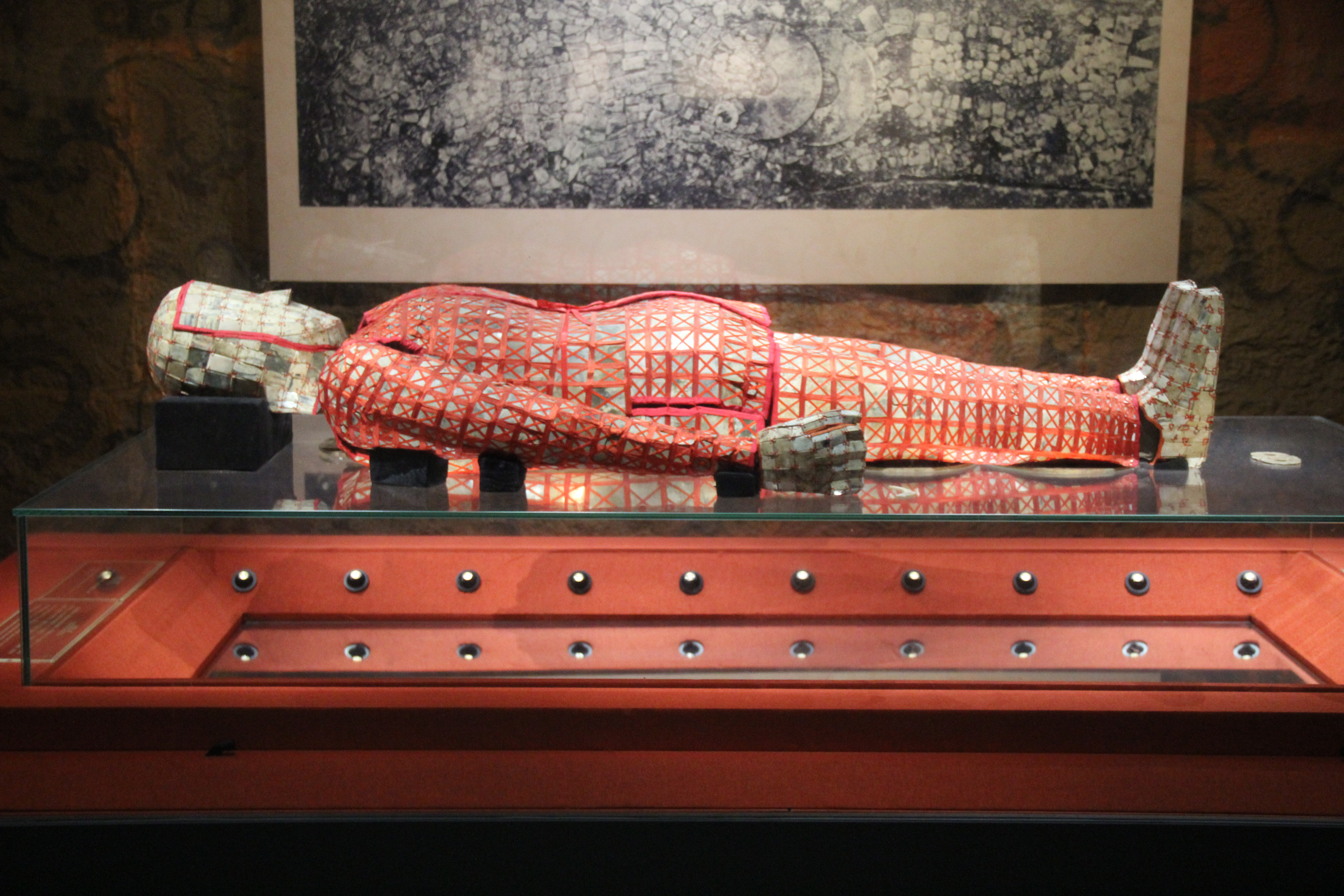
Jade Burial Suit Sewn with Silk Thread reconstruction

This section also showcases the burial customs employed by Zhao Mo:

- The Occupant's Coffin: The coffin structure of Zhao Mo, the tomb occupant, originally consisted of an inner coffin nested within an outer coffin, both crafted from lacquered wood. After two millennia, the wood had completely decayed, leaving only archaeological traces. Based on these remains, the outer coffin measured approximately 3.3 meters long and 1 meter wide, while the inner coffin was about 2.2 meters long and 0.75 meters wide (height undetermined). Notably, the outer coffin's side boards were once fixed with six gilded bronze ring-pulls featuring taotie (a mythical gluttonous beast) motifs. These were arranged with two on each side and one each at the head and foot ends. The exhibition displays a scientifically reconstructed model of the coffin structure and ring-pulls, meticulously recreated based on the archaeological evidence.
- Jade Burial Suit Sewn with Silk Thread: This jade burial suit worn by Zhao Mo at his interment represents China's earliest complete jade suit discovered to date and remains the only such suit ever unearthed in the Lingnan region. Unlike over a dozen gold-threaded jade suits found elsewhere in China, this unique silk-threaded example stands unparalleled, making it another crown jewel of the Nanyue King Museum. The suit is 1.73 meters long and composed of 2,291 jade pieces woven together with silk threads and affixed to a linen backing. The original silk and linen had decayed after two millennia. Archaeologists spent three years meticulously reconstructing the suit, with modern silk threads and linen added to restore its integrity.
- Burial Ritual Jade Bi: Dozens of jade bi were ritually arranged around Zhao Mo's body in specific positions and layered configurations. This practice exemplifies the institutionalized Han Dynasty tradition of enveloping the deceased with jade objects—believed to preserve the body, ward off evil, and guide the soul to immortality. The strategic placement of these disks reflected cosmological symbolism and elite burial customs of the era.
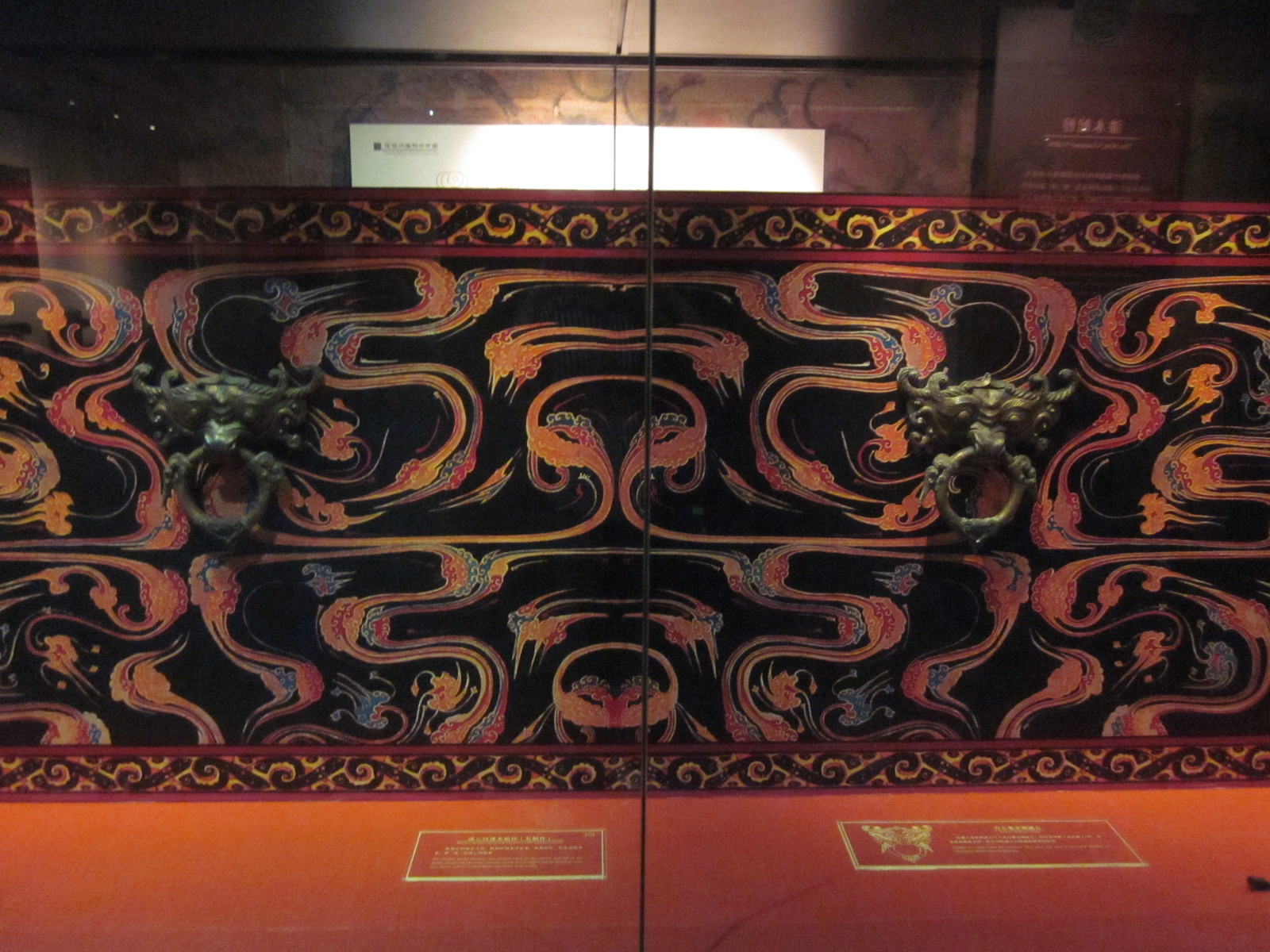
Reconstructed model of Zhao Mo's Coffin

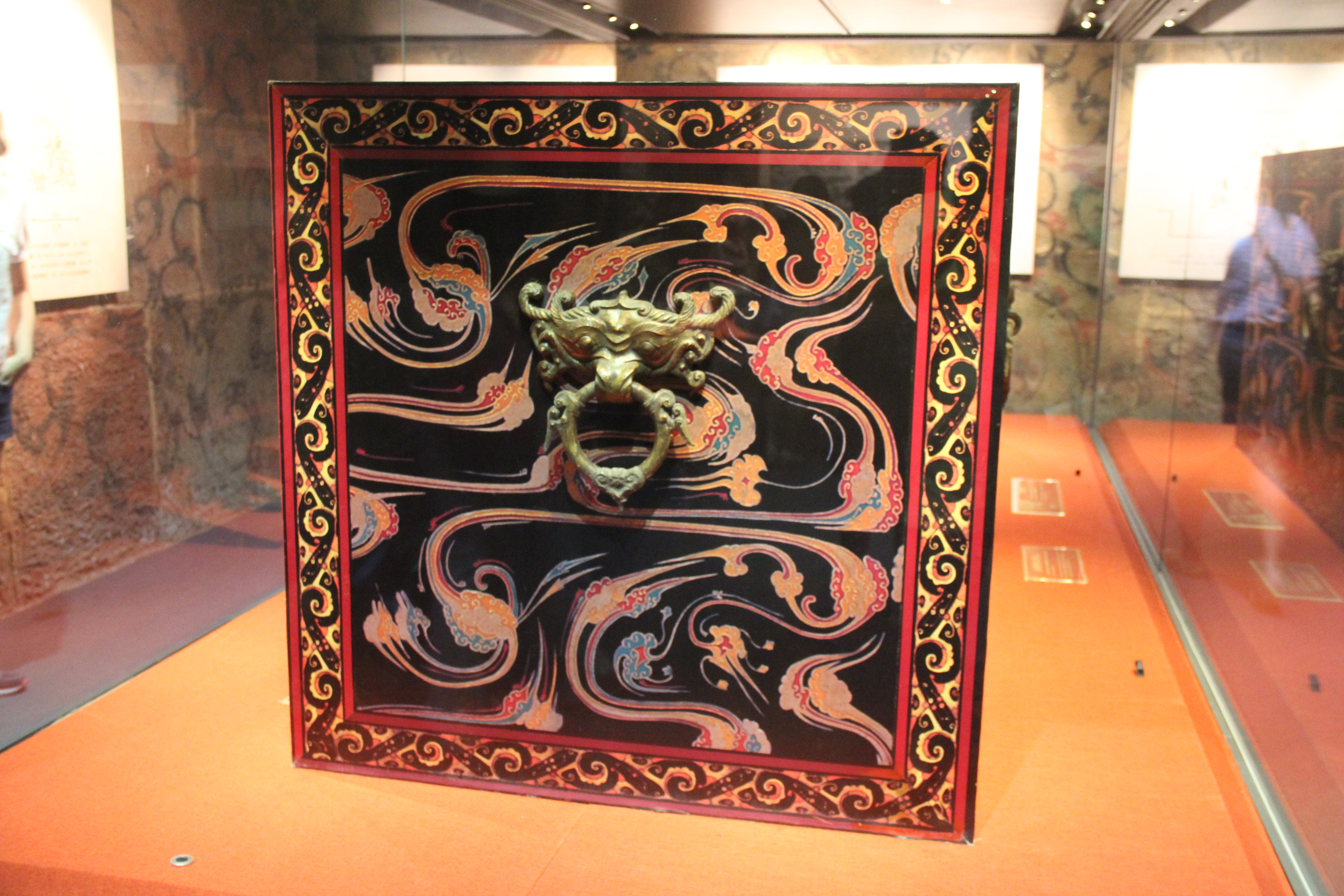
Reconstructed model of Zhao Mo's Coffin

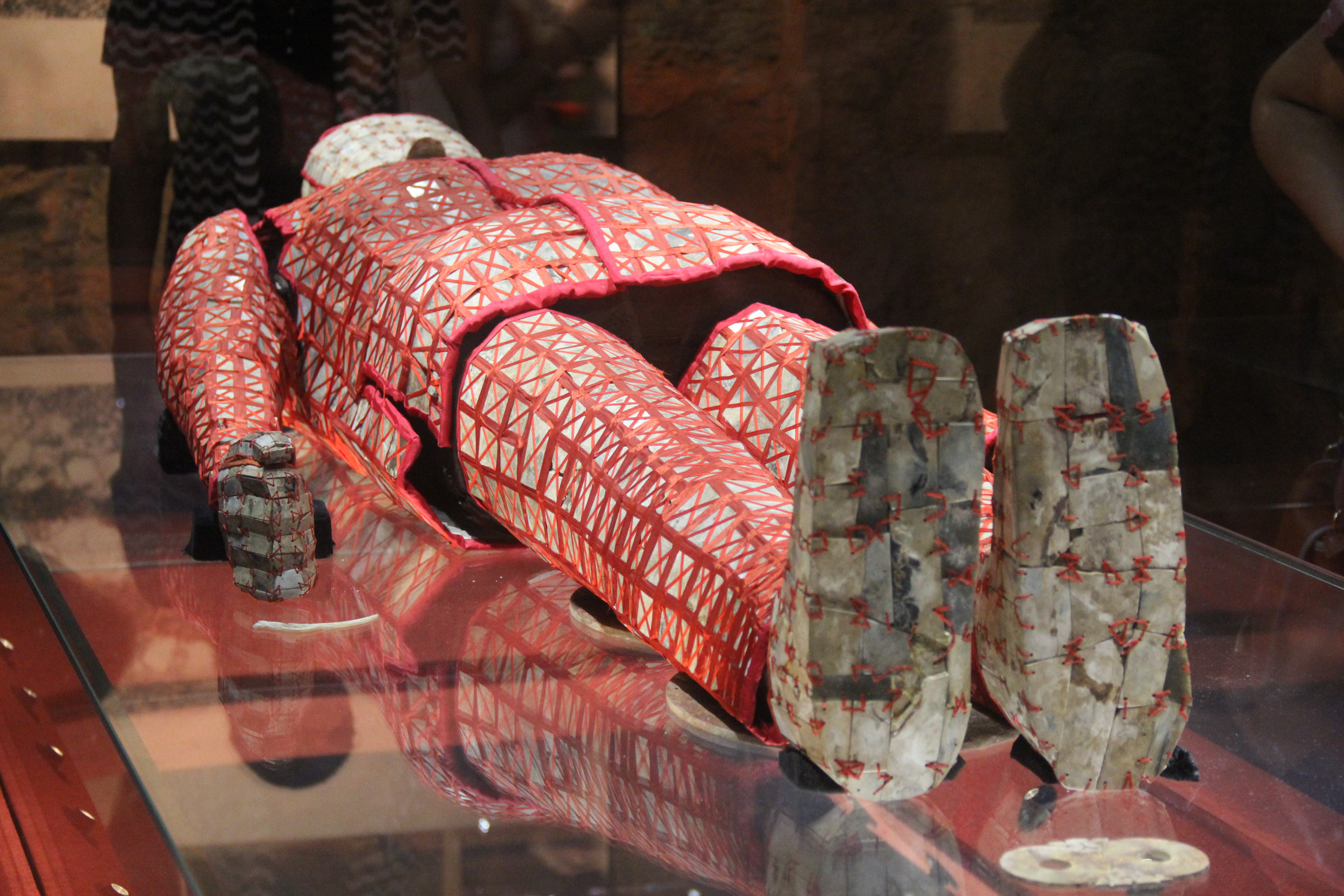
Jade Burial Suit Sewn with Silk Thread

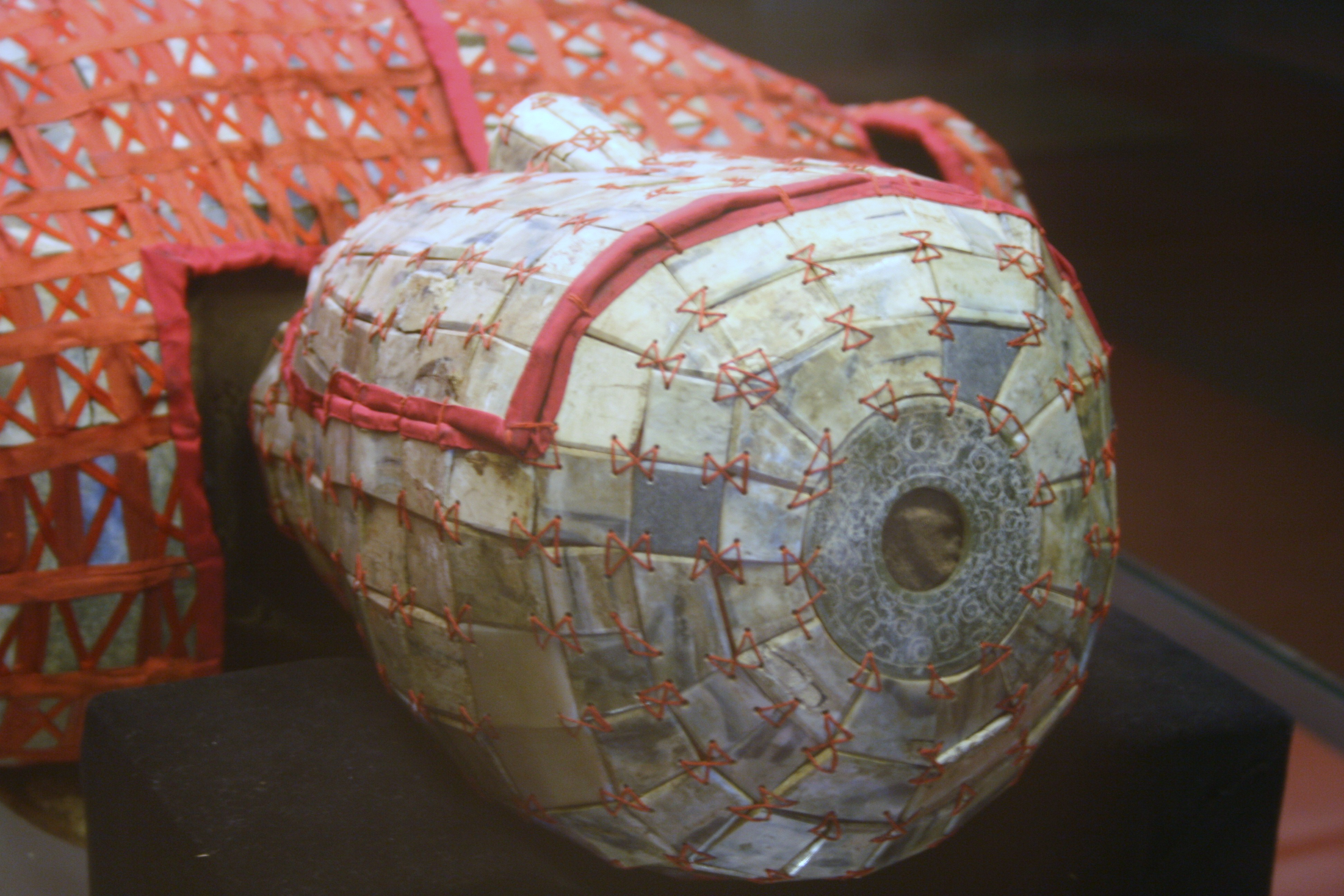
Head of Jade Burial Suit

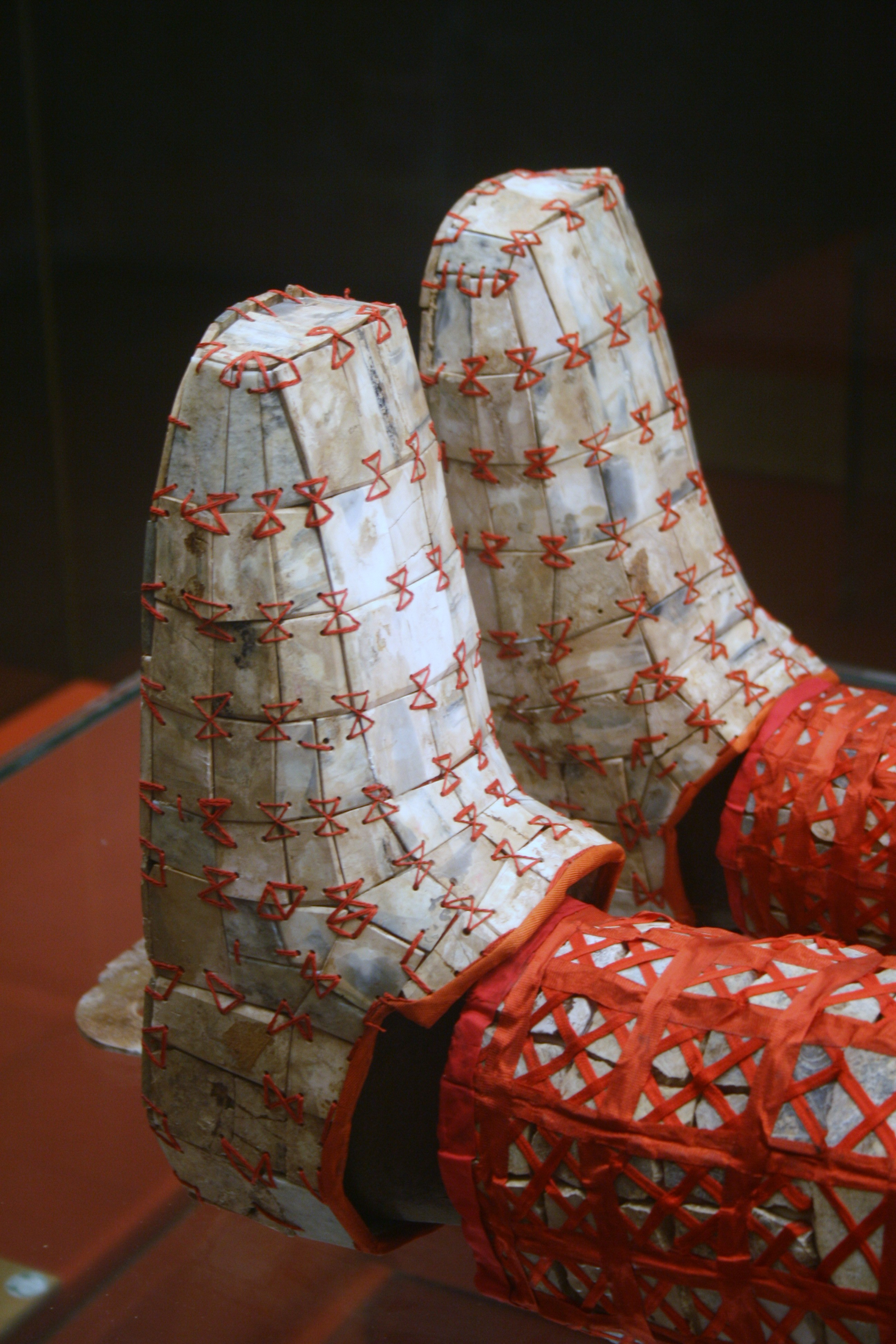
Feet of Jade Burial Suit

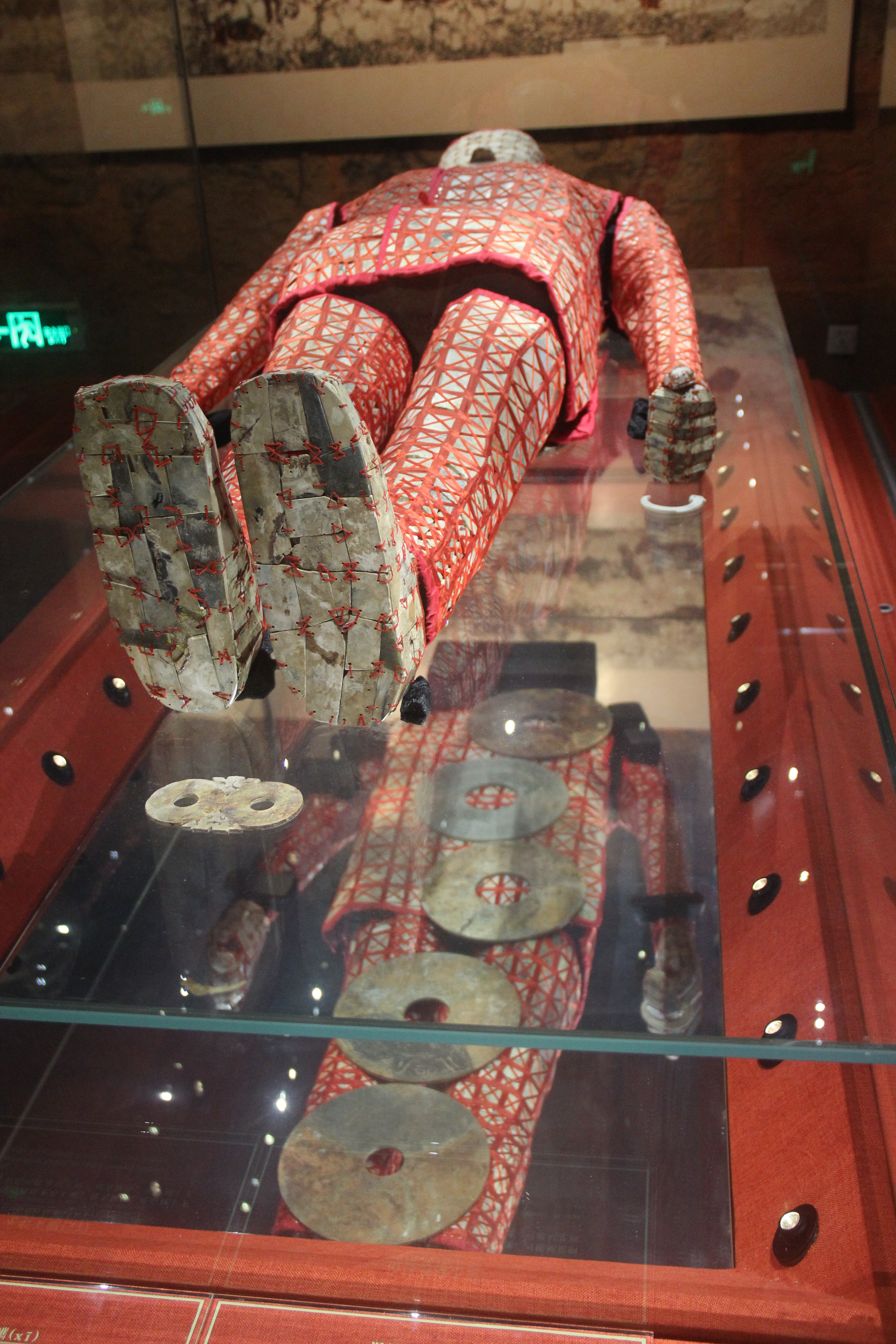
Burial Ritual Jade Bi

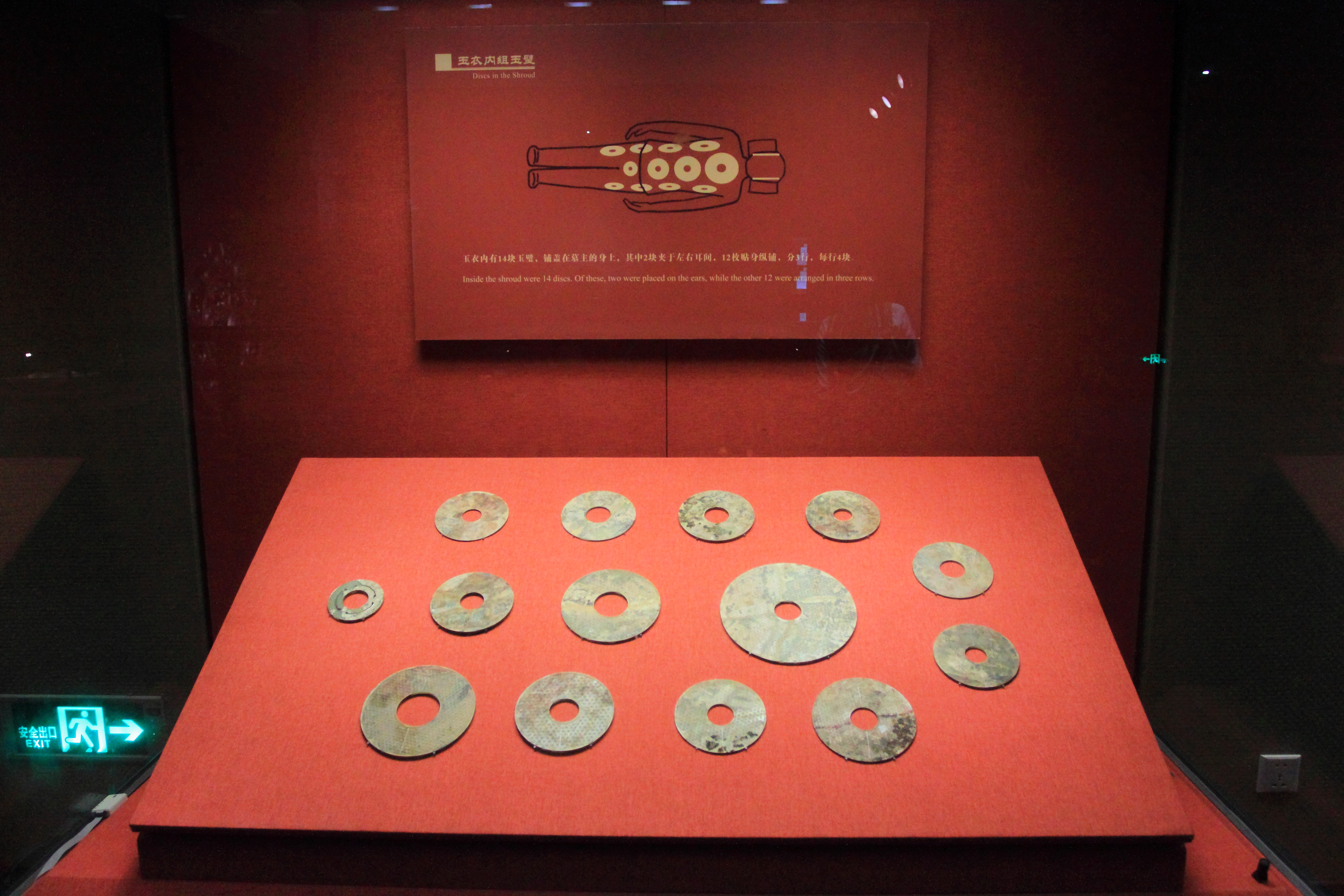
Burial Ritual Jade Bi

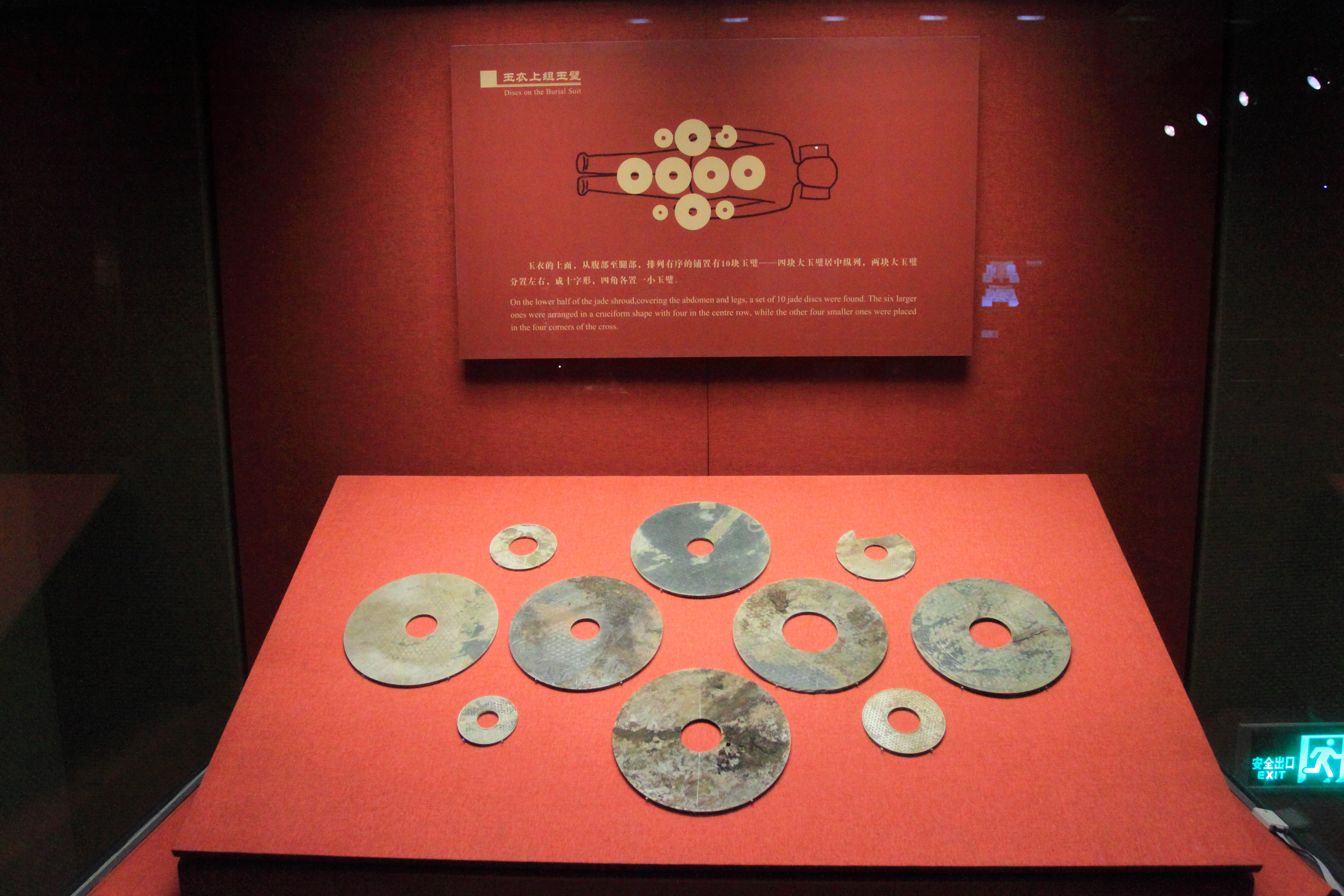
Burial Ritual Jade Bi

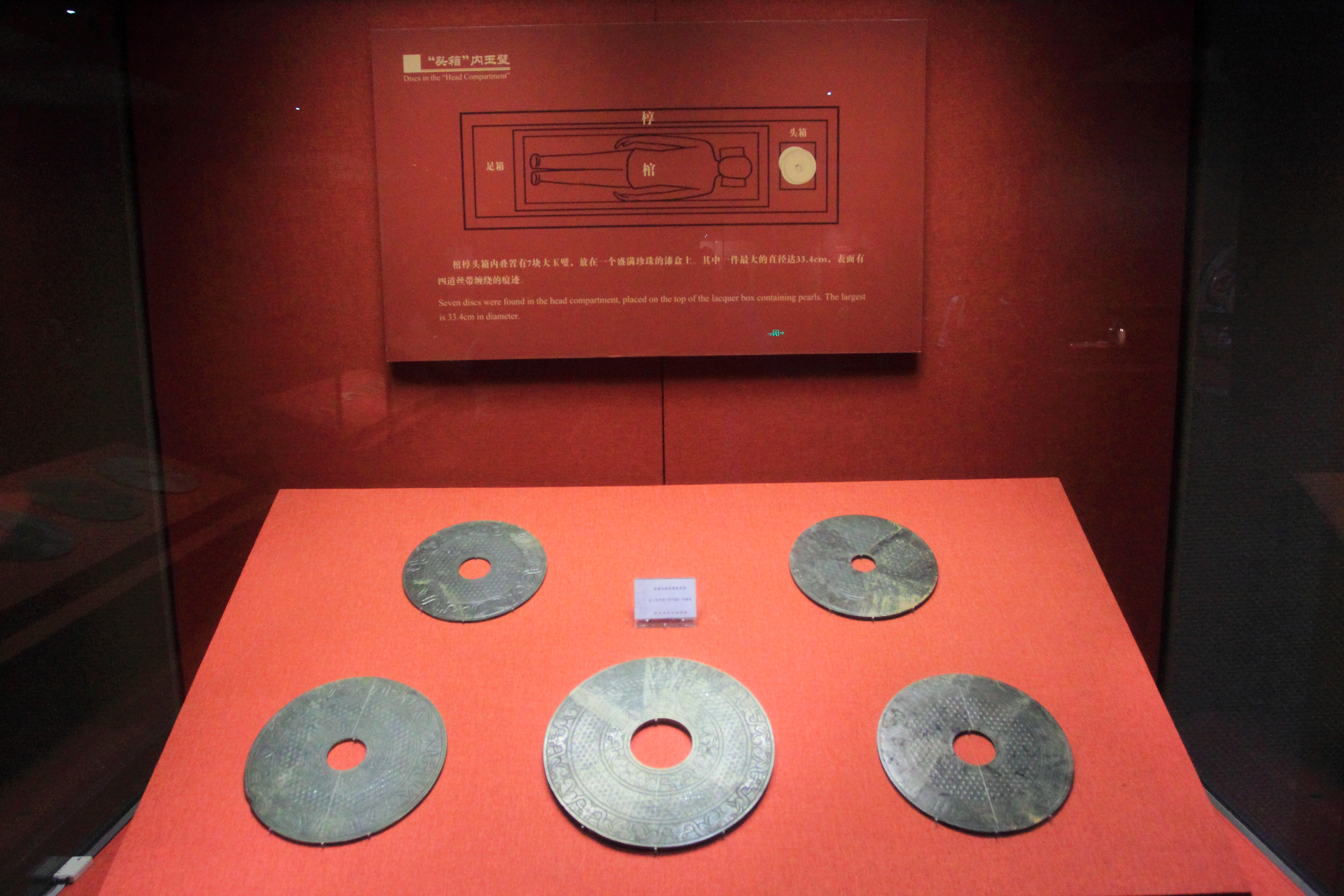
Burial Ritual Jade Bi

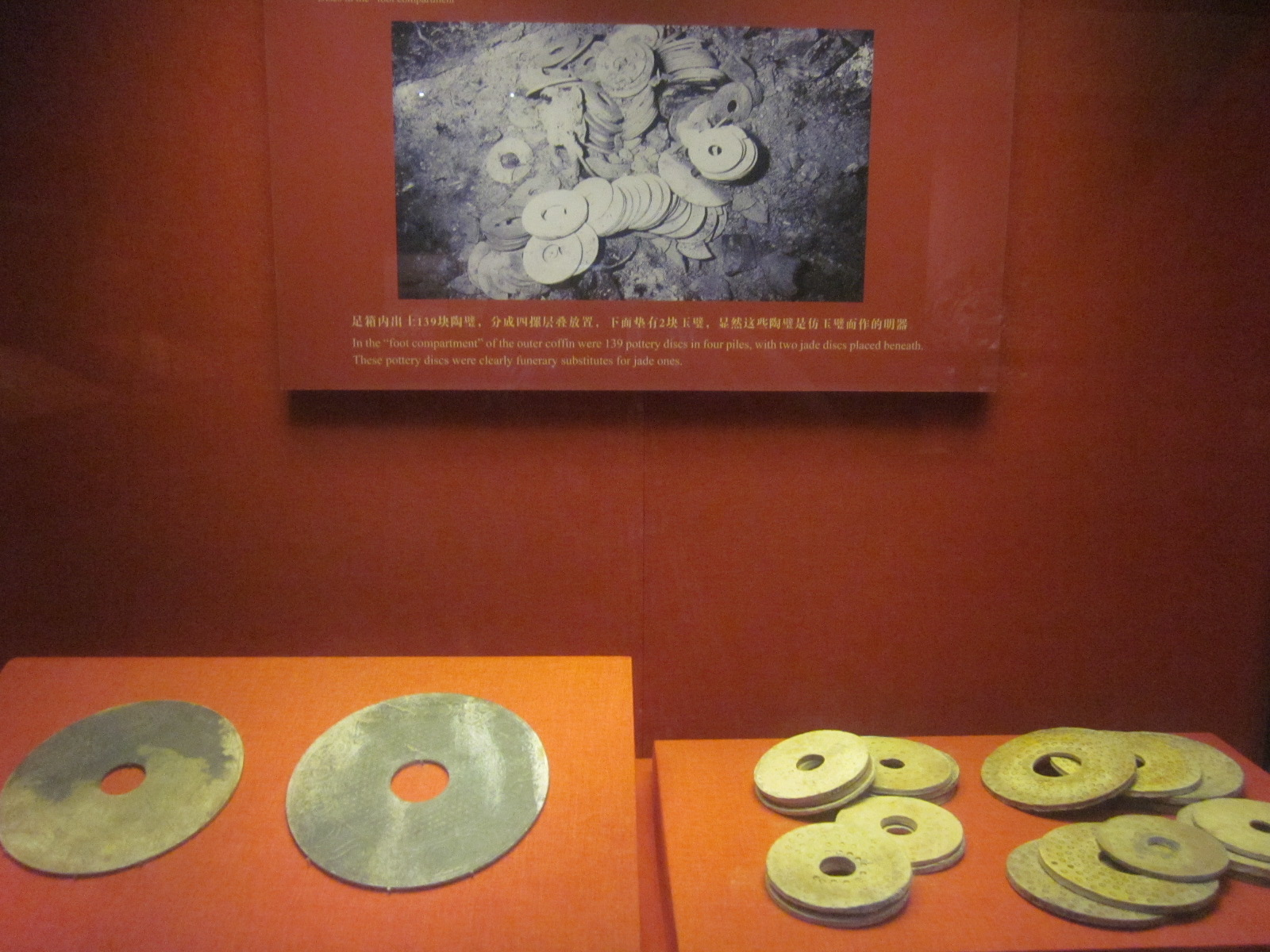
Burial Ritual Jade Bi

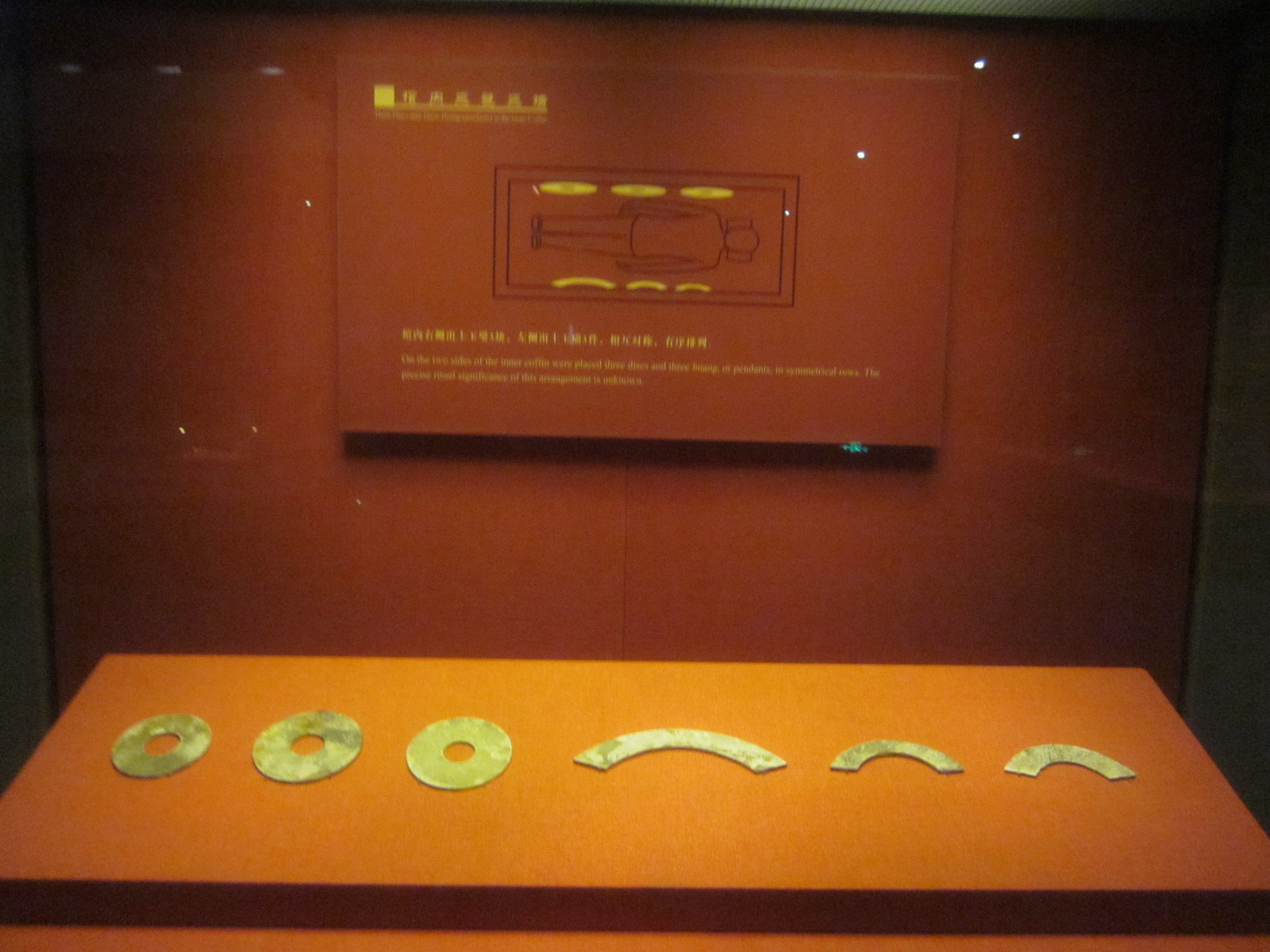
Burial Ritual Jade Bi

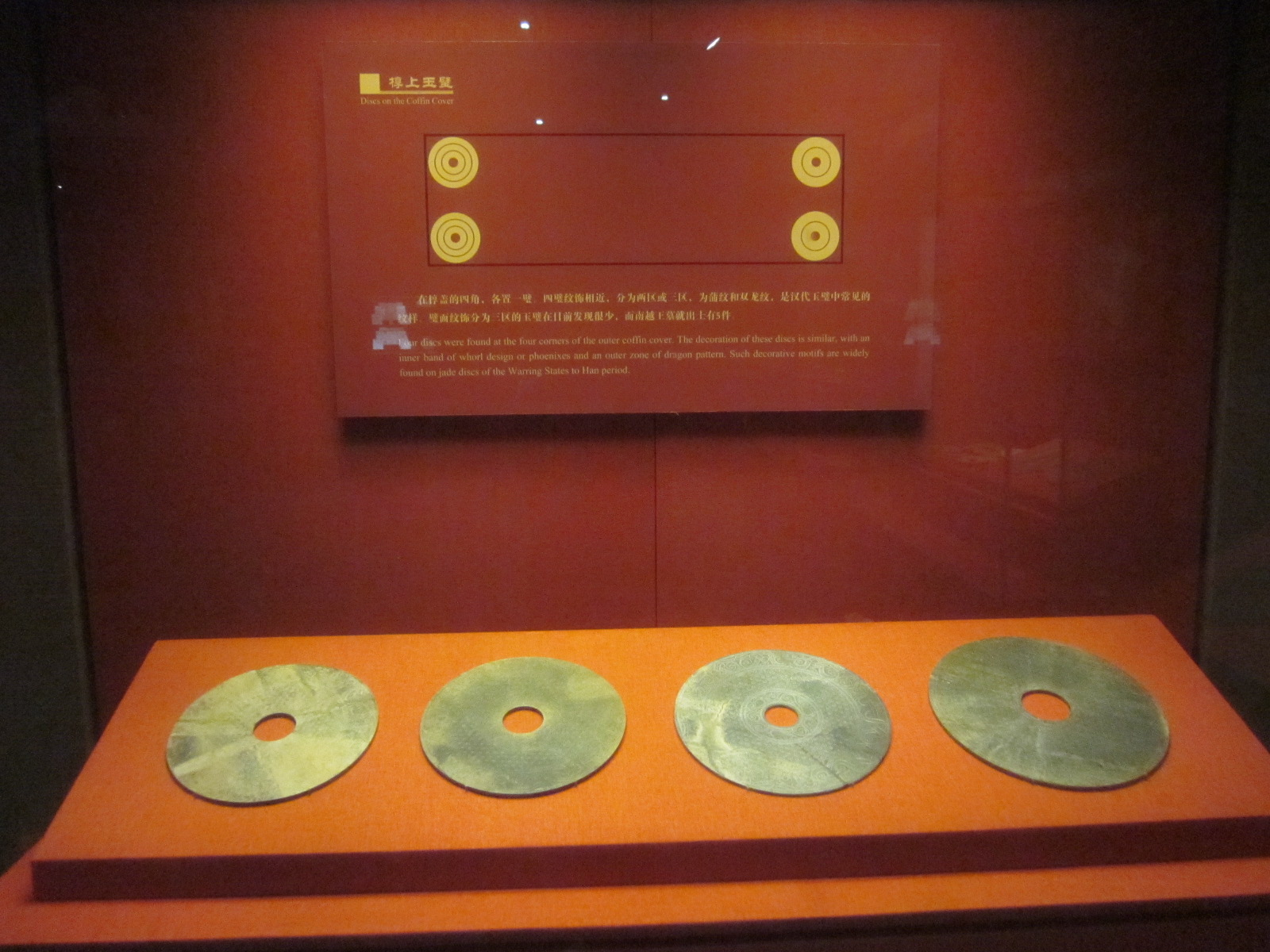
Burial Ritual Jade Bi

==== The Collection of Beautiful Jades ====
The Tomb of Nanyue King yielded 224 jade items/sets. Besides the jade used for burial and ritual, there are 140 pieces/sets of decorative jade including Jade Vessels, Jade Garment Belt Hooks, Jade Ornaments, and Jade Sword Ornaments. These artifacts represent the jade craftsmanship of the era and the Western Han period. The collection remains preserved and is studied for its historical and artistic characteristics.

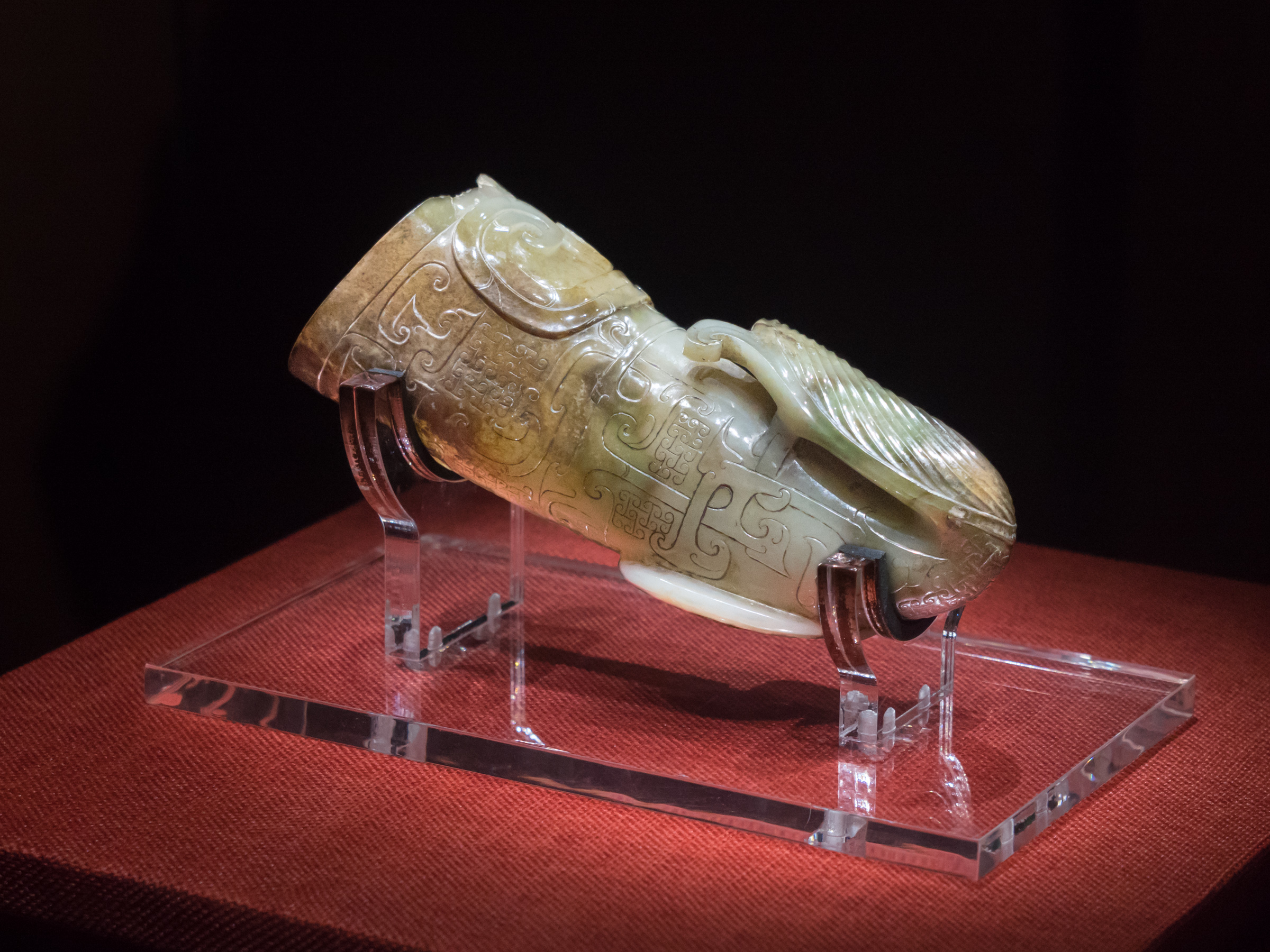
Jade Drinking Vessel in Rhinoceros Horn Shape, an artifact forbidden to be exhibited abroad

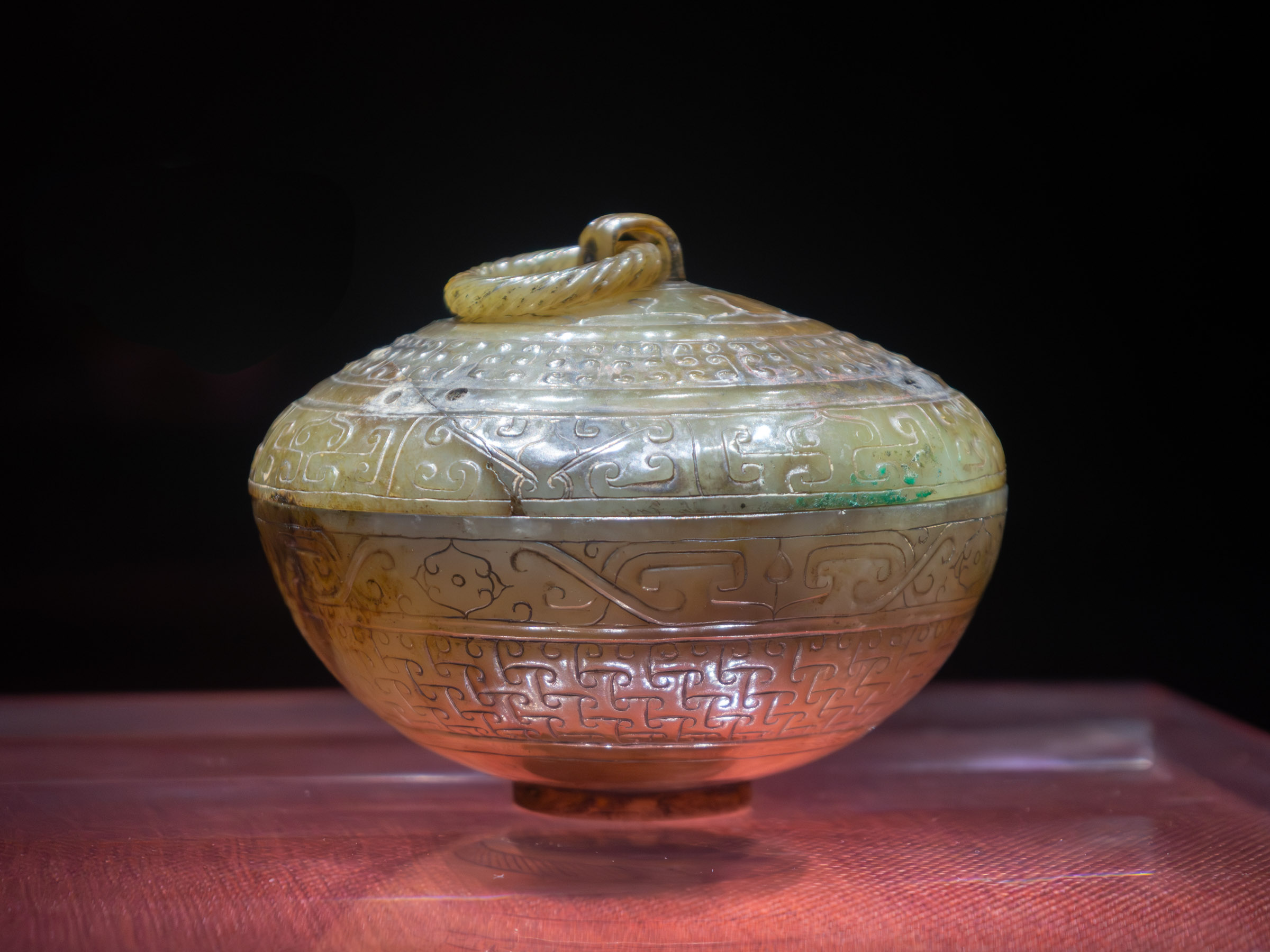
Jade Covered Box

Jade containers from the Han Dynasty are exceptionally rare today, with only less than two dozens known examples surviving worldwide. The Nanyue King's Tomb yielded five jade vessels, each considered to hold artistic, historical and cultural value::

- Jade Drinking Cup for Collecting Sweet Dew: The Jade Drinking Cup for Collecting Sweet Dew is an intricately crafted composite artifact integrating five distinct materials: jade, gold, silver, bronze, and wood. Its central feature is a pale green jade cup standing 11.75 cm tall with a mouth diameter of 4.15 cm. This cup rests upon a separately carved jade base, which in turn is supported by a wooden spacer. A perforated petal-shaped jade mount encircles the cup's midsection, connected to the bronze tray below by three dragons featuring gold heads and silver bodies.
- Bronze Beaker Mounted with Jade Plaques: This cup, excavated from the head compartment of the inner coffin, stands 16 cm tall with a mouth diameter of 7.2 cm. Its octagonal prism-shaped cup body rests upon a flared foot, while the entire structure features a two-tiered gilded bronze frame: the upper section inlaid with eight rectangular jade slabs, and the lower section embedded with five heart-shaped jade plaques. The lid mirrors this craftsmanship—its outer rim framed in gilded bronze and centered with a pale green jade disc. This artifact exemplifies the pinnacle of Han Dynasty inlay techniques, where the seamless integration of lustrous gilded bronze and translucent jade creates a striking interplay of textures and materials. The precision required to fit irregularly shaped jade pieces into the metallic framework demonstrates extraordinary technical sophistication, highlighting the Nanyue Kingdom's mastery of composite artistry during the Western Han period.
- Bronze and Jade Cup: This jade cup was discovered with a sacrificial victim in the western side chamber of the Nanyue King's Tomb. Standing 12.6 cm tall with an 8.6 cm mouth diameter, this artifact features a gilded bronze frame embedded with nine pale green jade panels. Its base consists of a single circular jade disk, while the accompanying lacquered wooden lid is adorned with three crescent-shaped jade inlays. Though its frame and inlay technique closely resemble the Bronze Beaker Mounted with Jade Plaques, the addition of the composite lacquered wood-and-jade lid demonstrates even greater technical sophistication.
- Jade Drinking Vessel in Rhinoceros Horn Shape: The Jade Drinking Vessel, excavated from the head compartment of the main coffin chamber, represents a tour de force of Western Han jade craftsmanship. Carved from a single block of translucent pale green nephrite, this 18.4-centimeter vessel tapers elegantly from its 5.8–6.7 cm wide mouth to a narrow base, with astonishingly thin walls measuring a mere 0.2–0.3 cm and weighing 372.7 grams. Its hollowed interior follows the natural curve of the horn-like form, while the exterior features a masterfully carved kui that spirals dynamically around the cup's body. The kui's form emerges subtly through low-relief carving at the base, gradually rising into dramatic high-relief near the rim, and culminates in an elegantly bifurcated tail that curls upward with remarkable fluidity. As the only known surviving angular jade cup from high antiquity, this artifact synthesizes every major jade-working technique of its era—including precision line engraving, multi-level relief carving, full-round sculpture, openwork perforation, and meticulous core drilling. The harmonious integration of mythical symbolism, spatial composition, and material virtuosity reflects an unparalleled maturity of artistic vision. Such extraordinary craftsmanship earned it designation in 2002 as one of the first batch of Chinese cultural relics forbidden to be exhibited abroad and another crown jewel of the museum.
- Jade Covered Box: The Jade Box, unearthed from the head compartment of the inner coffin, stands 7.7 cm tall with a maximum diameter of 9.8 cm. Crafted entirely from pale green nephrite, its lid and body join seamlessly through an interlocking lip-and-groove joint. A distinctive feature is the freely rotating jade ring adorning the lid, masterfully carved from the same jade block using openwork techniques. This vessel showcases extraordinary decorative complexity: the body displays a triple-tiered scheme featuring raised relief whirl patterns paired with incised calyx motifs at the top, incised interlocking whirls at the middle, and a cord pattern encircling the base. The lid's ornamentation unfolds in concentric bands—an inner ring of eight petal designs, a middle band of interlocking whirls, and an outer register combining thunder patterns with calyx motifs. Even the interior surface bears finely incised twin phoenixes, revealing meticulous attention to hidden details. Notably, the lid exhibits evidence of ancient repair where it had fractured—a testament to its owner's enduring fondness that transcended damage, ultimately securing its place as a cherished funerary accompaniment.
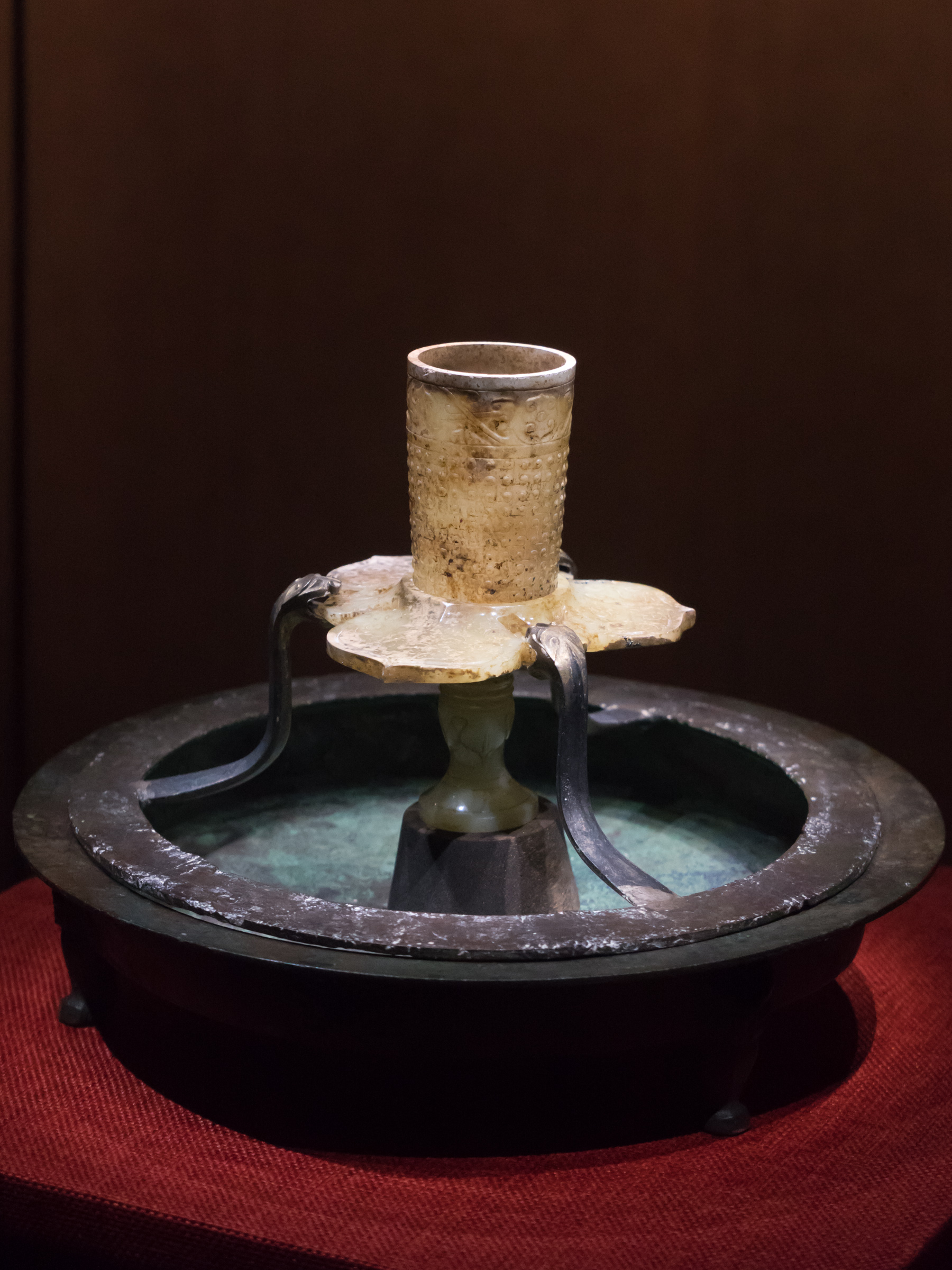
Jade Drinking Cup for Collecting Sweet Dew

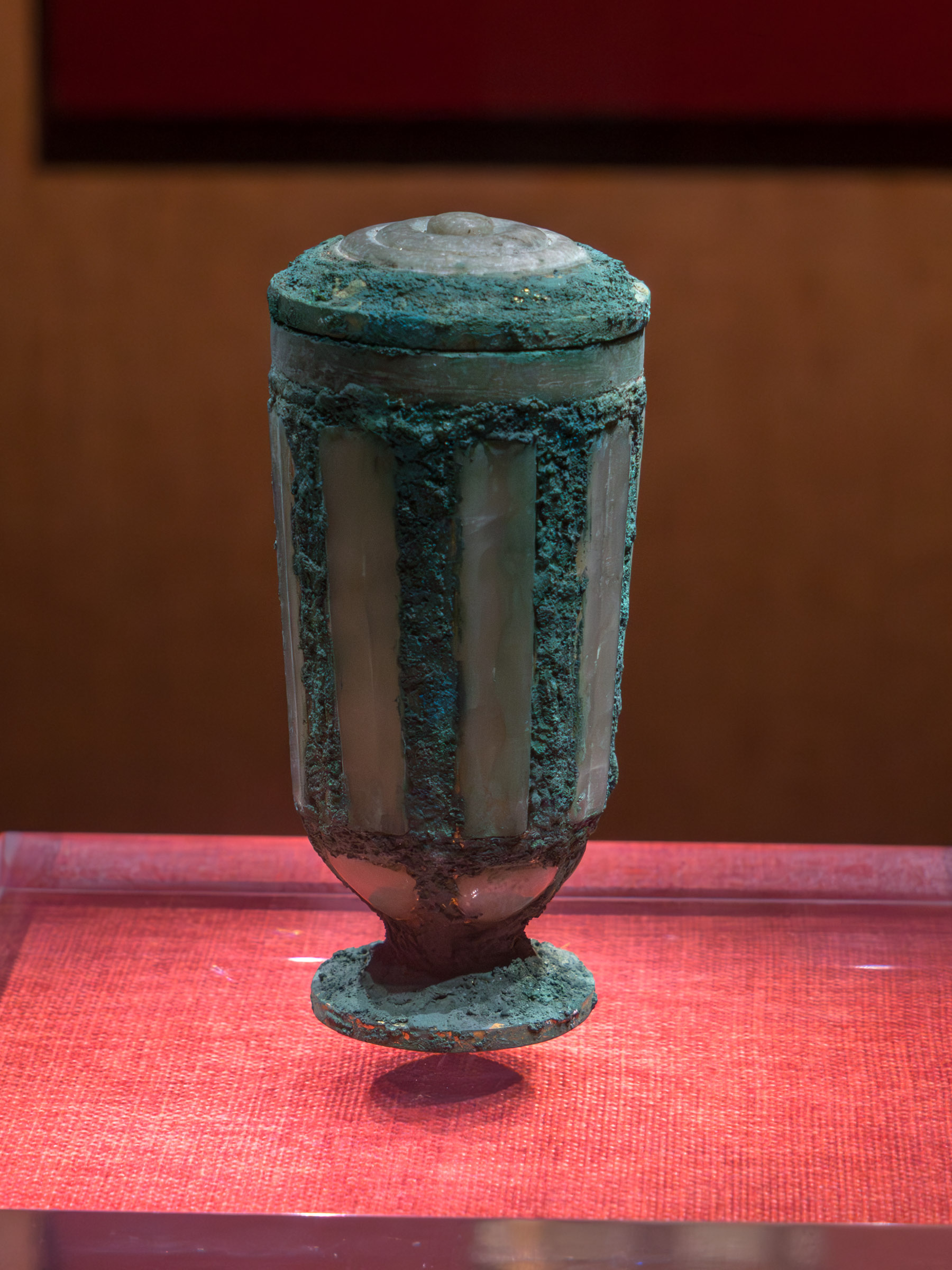
Bronze Beaker Mounted with Jade Plaques

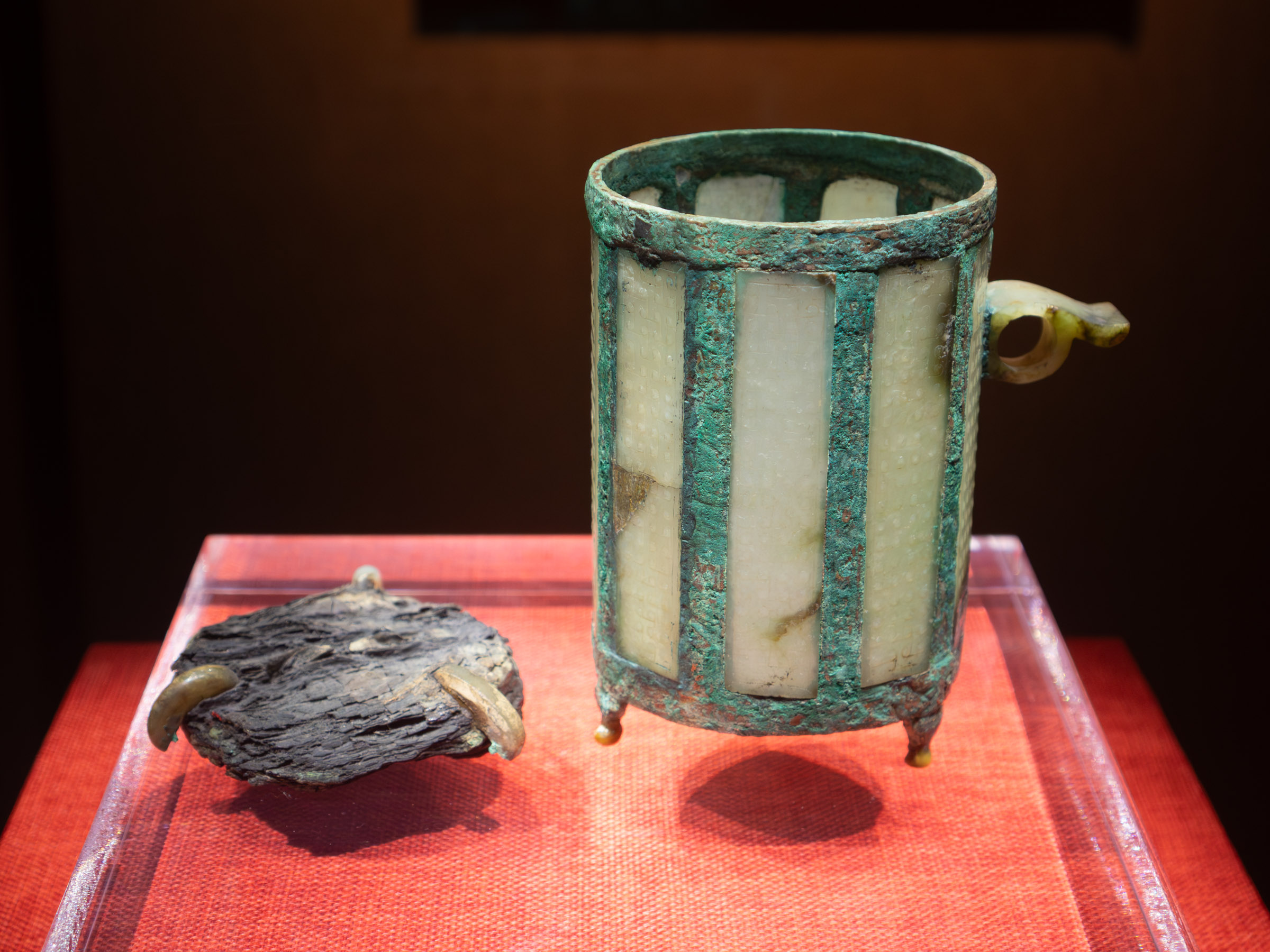
Bronze and Jade Cup

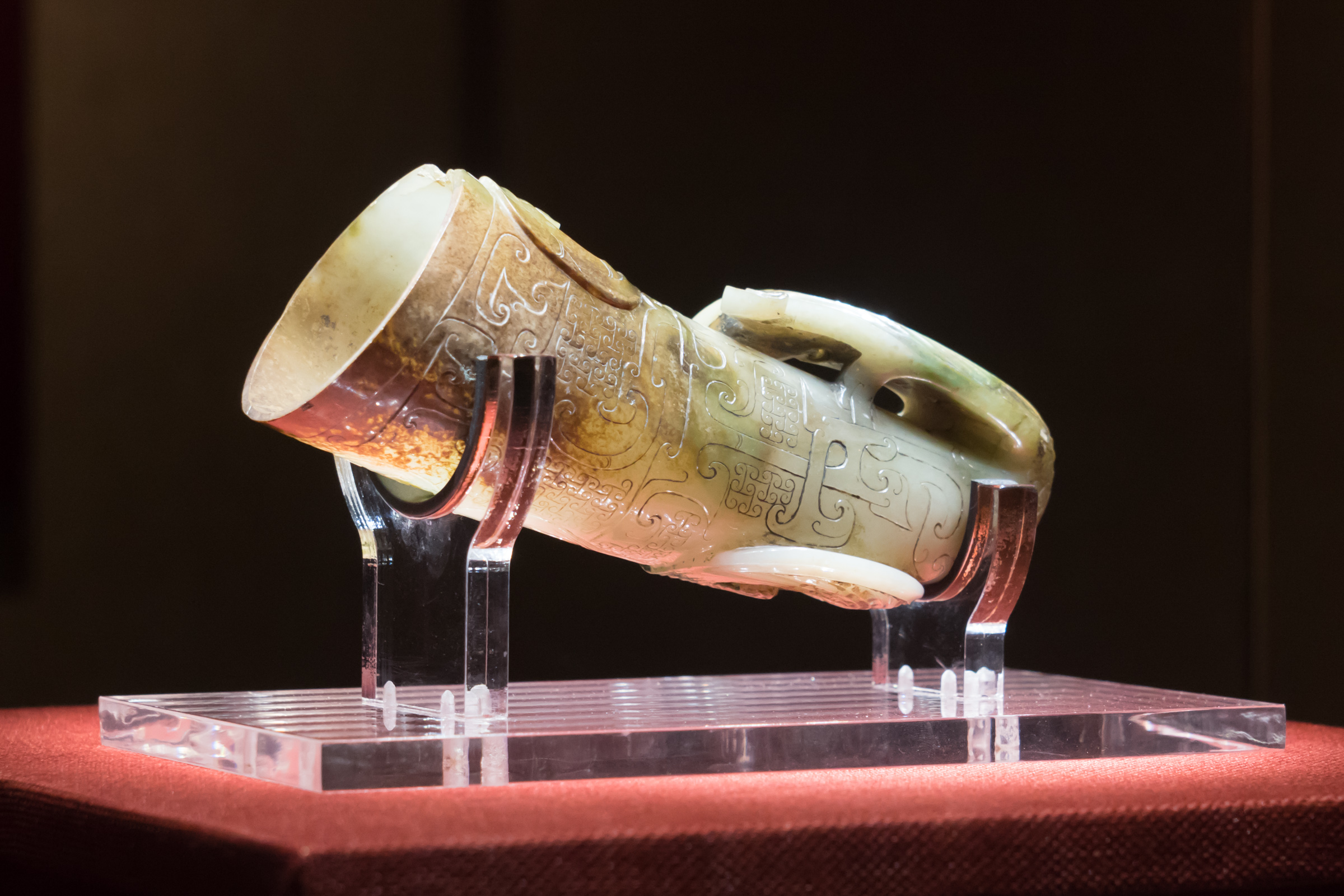
Jade Drinking Vessel in Rhinoceros Horn Shape

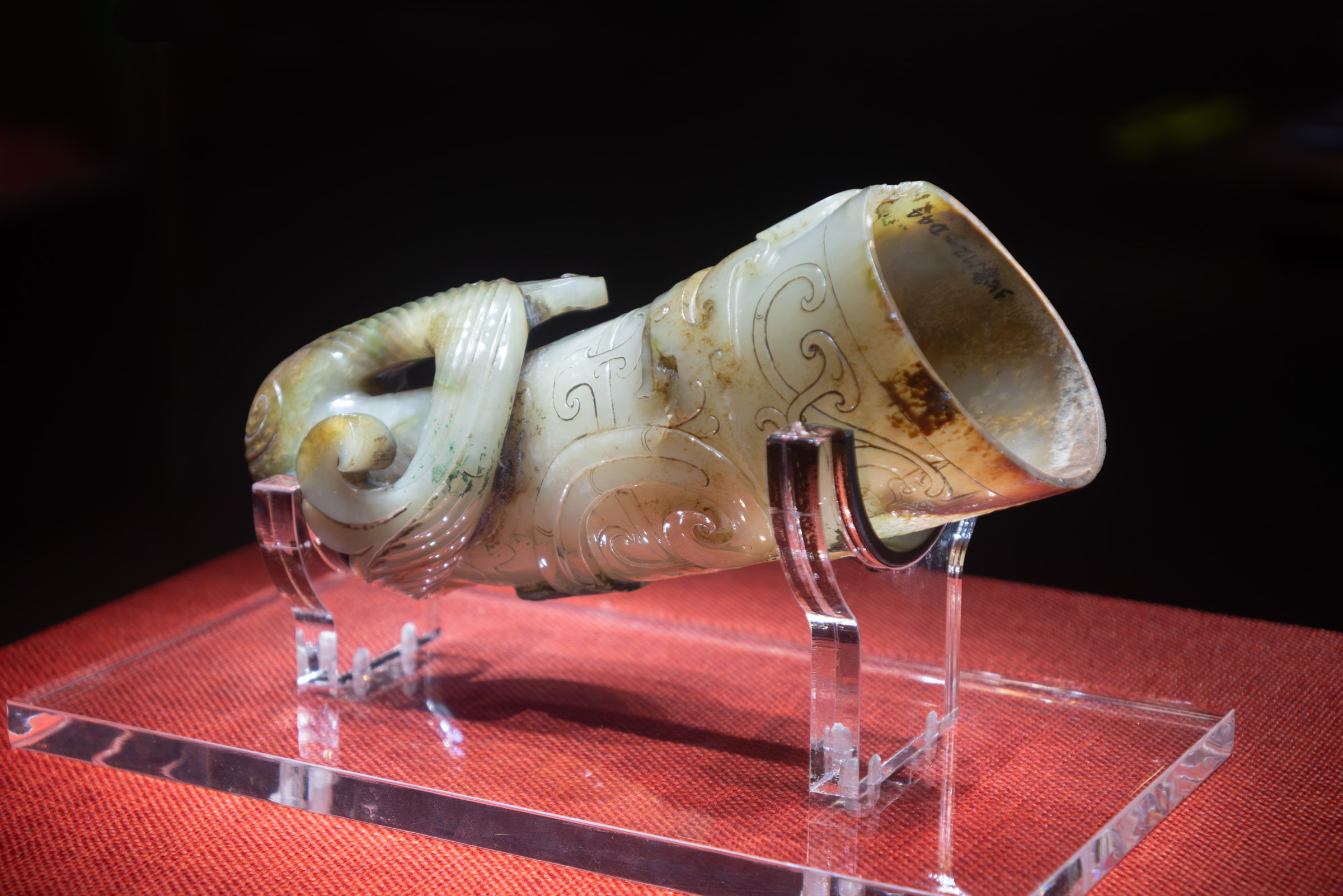
Jade Drinking Vessel in Rhinoceros Horn Shape

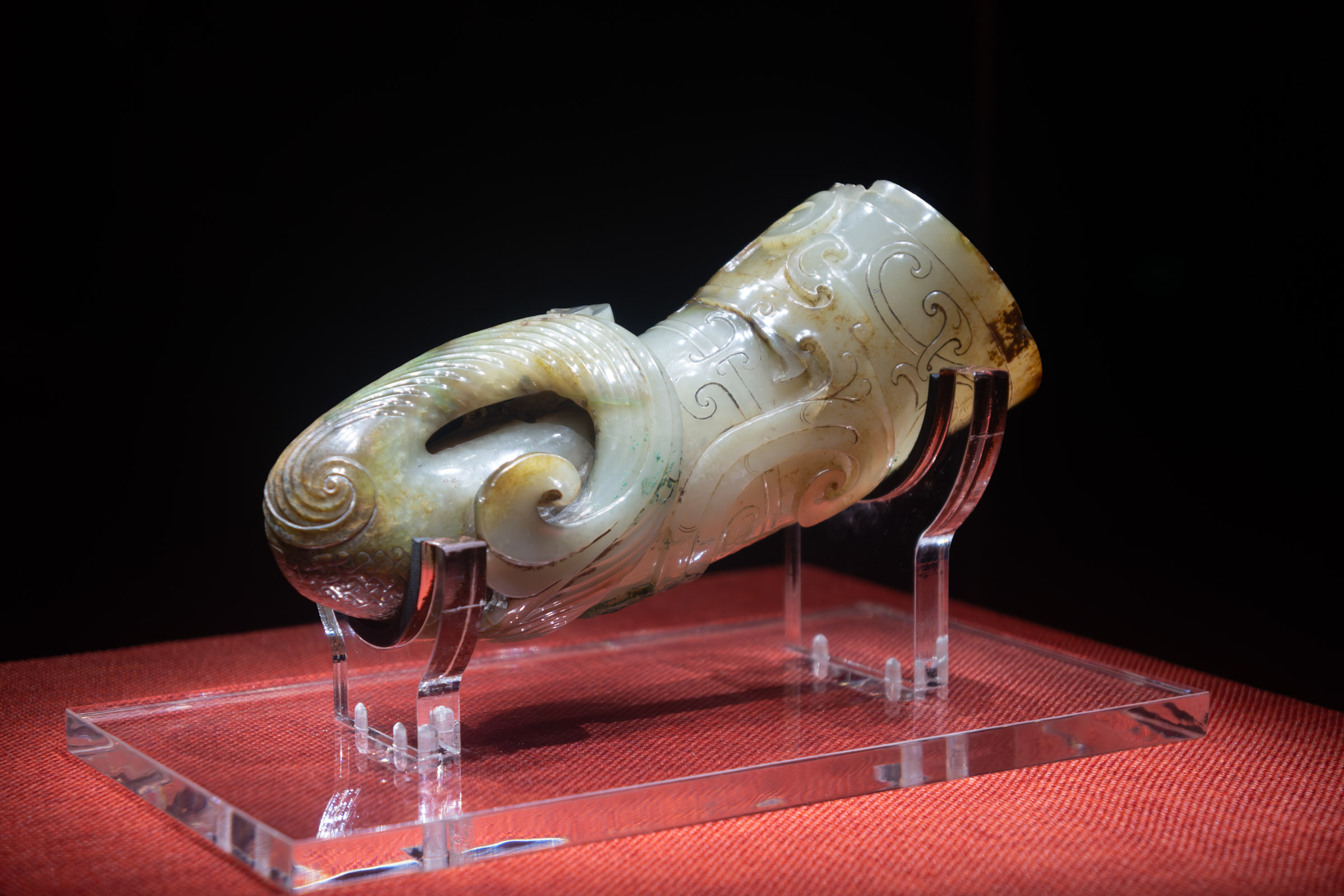
Jade Drinking Vessel in Rhinoceros Horn Shape

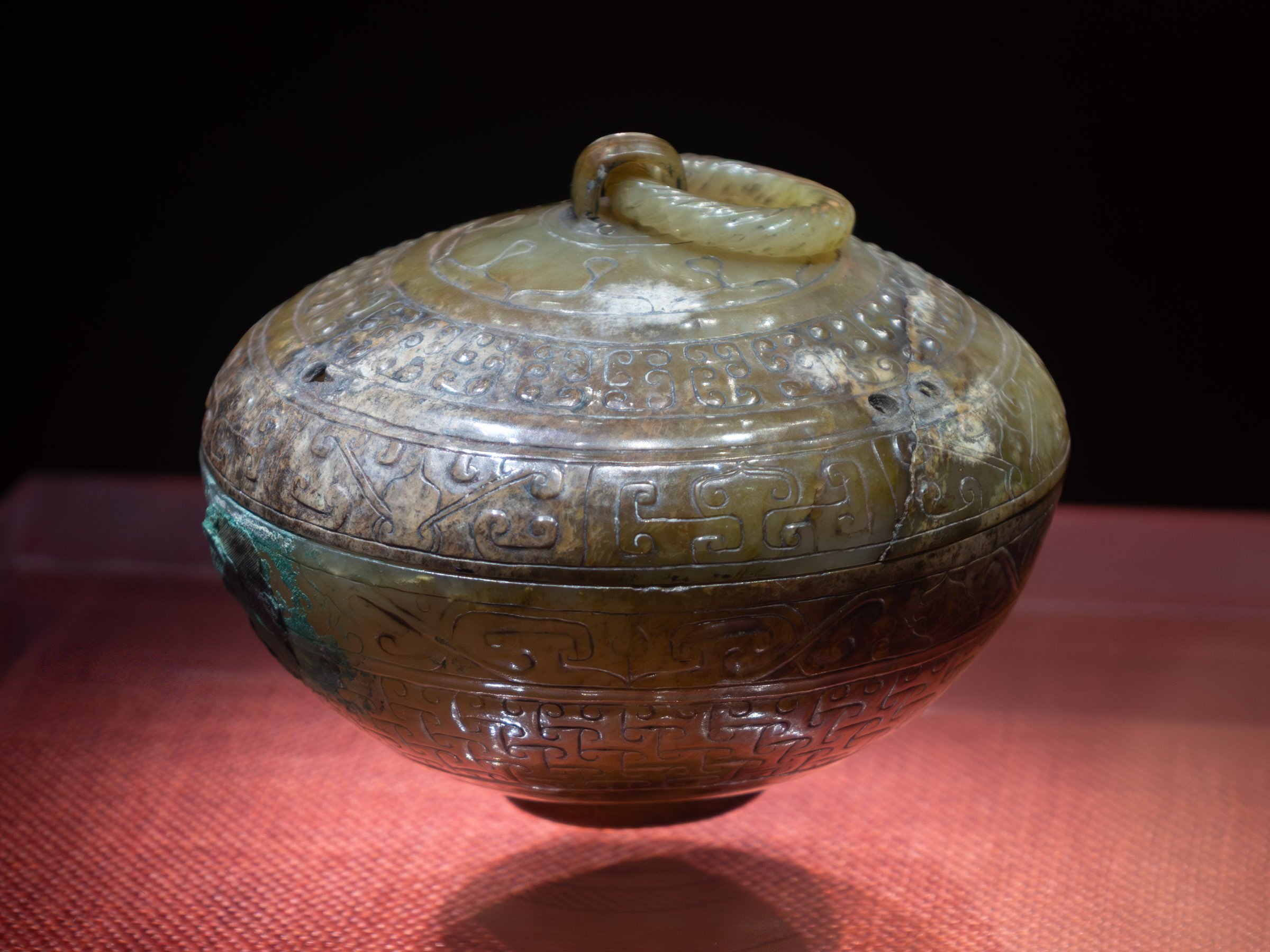
Jade Covered Box

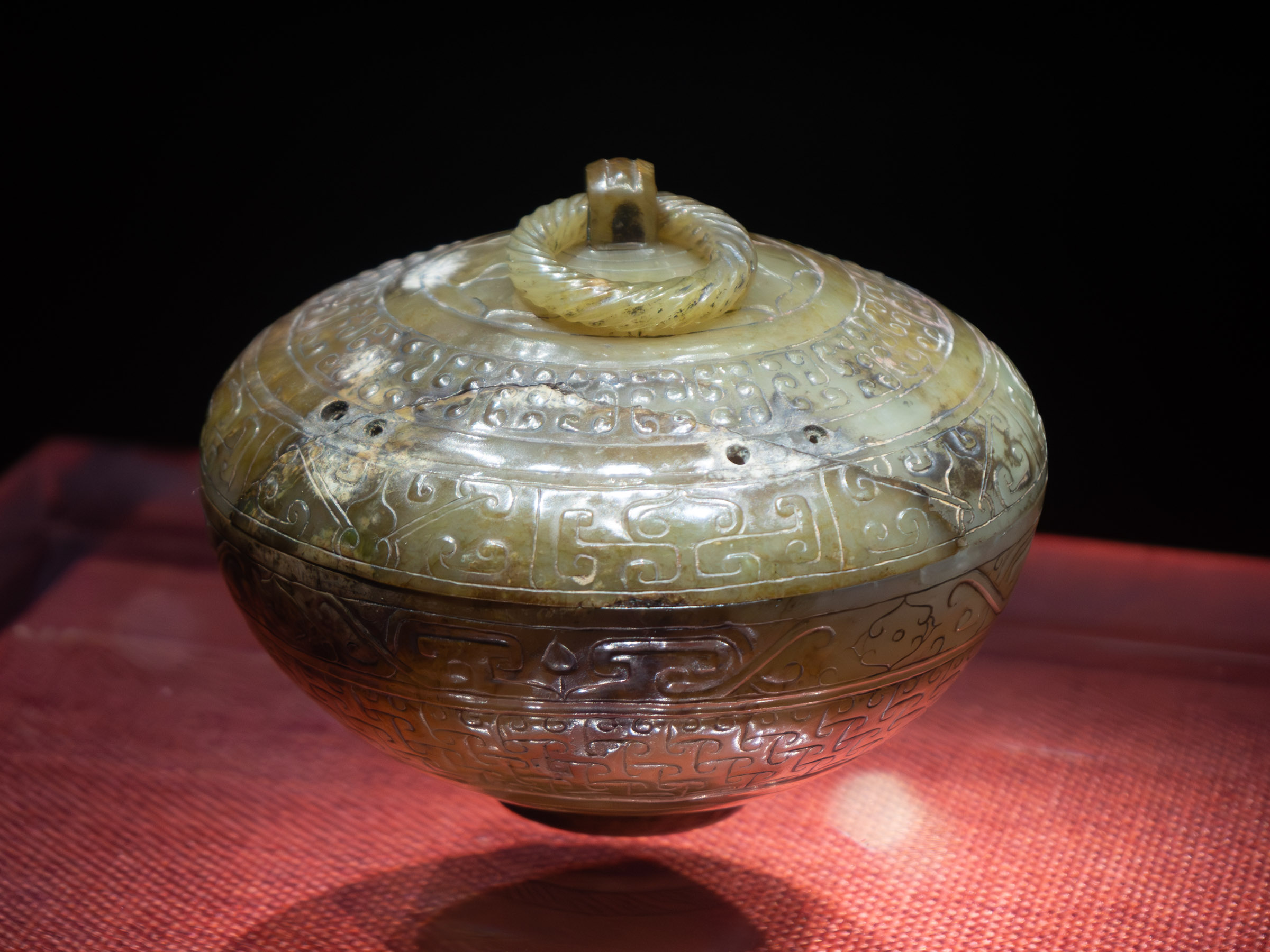
Jade Covered Box

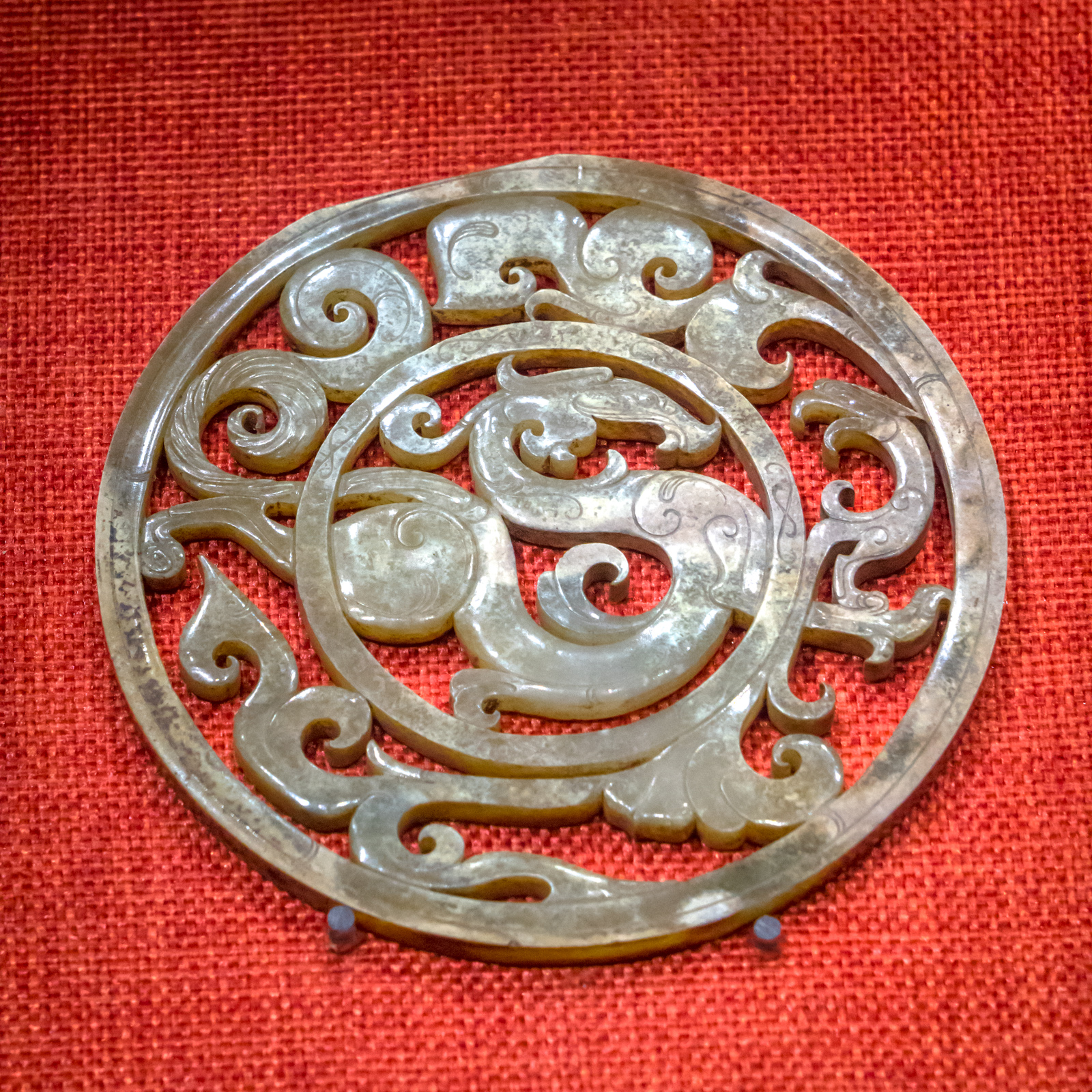
Jade Openwork Disk with Dragon and Phoenix, whose motif is selected as the museum's emblem

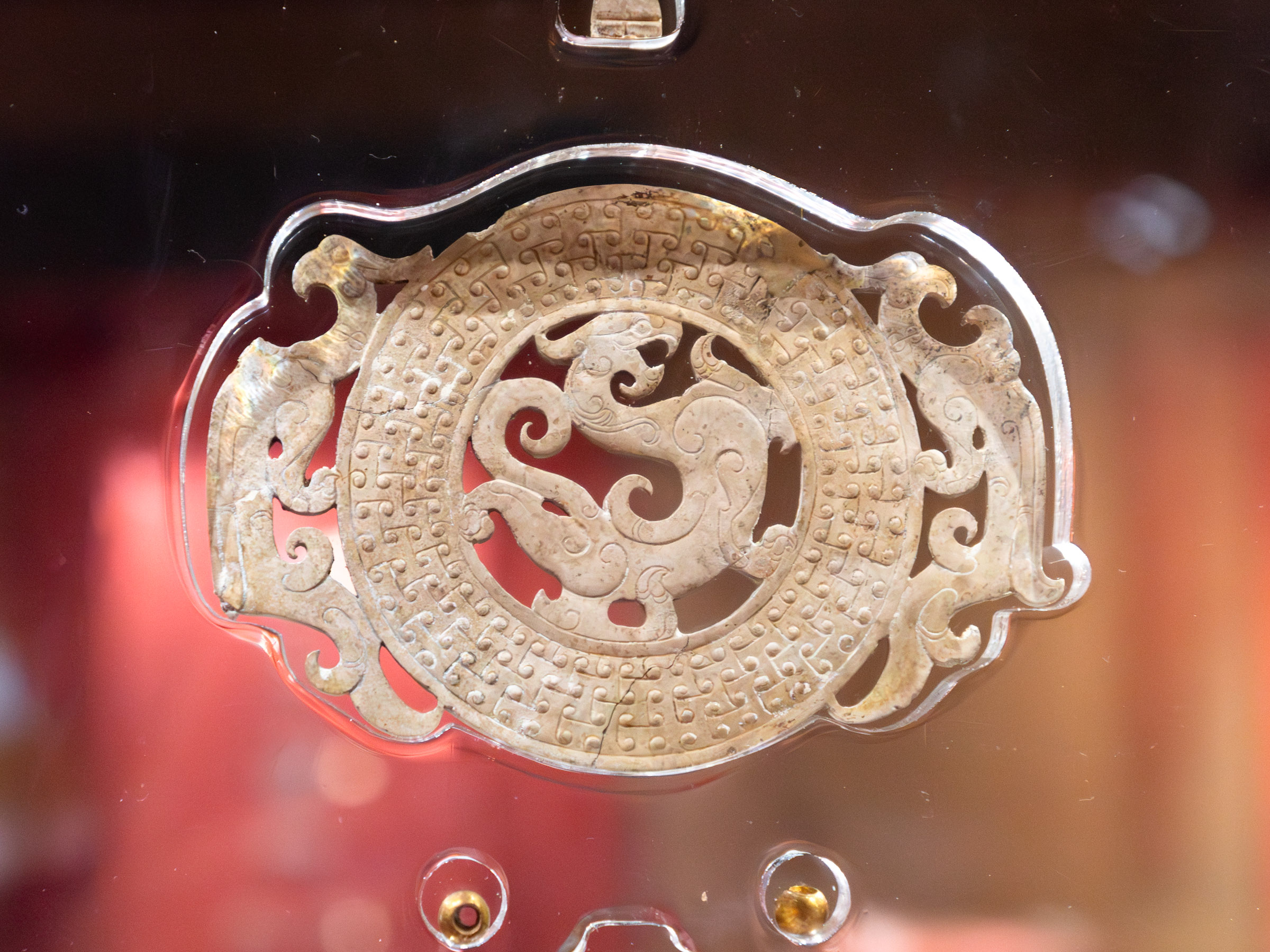
Openwork Dragon-Phoenix Bi as a component of the Ceremonial Jade Pendant Set of Zhao Mo

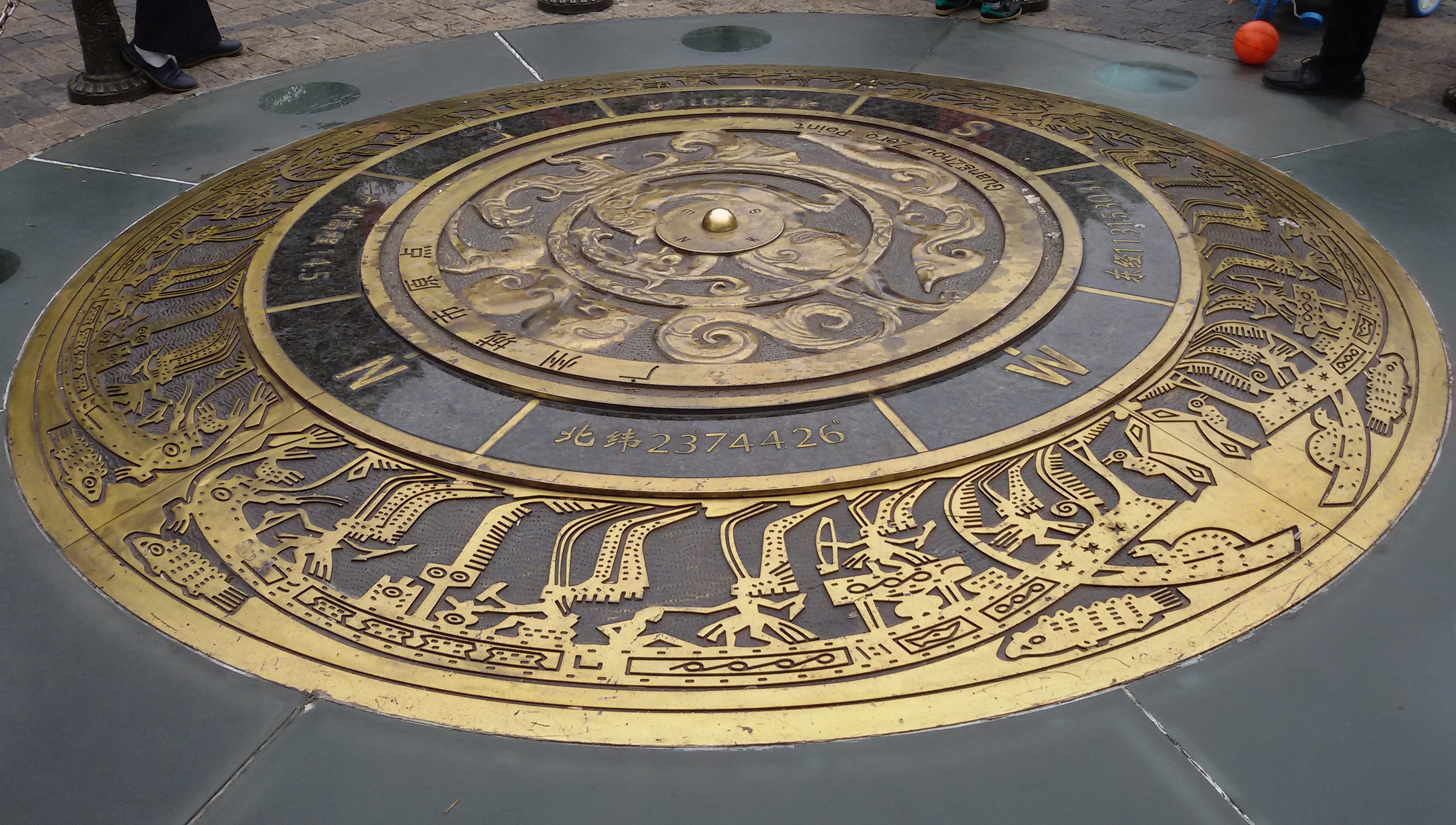
The Guangzhou Zero Point embedded into the ground at the People's Park of Guangzhou with the Jade Openwork Disk with Dragon and Phoenix motif at its center.

A total of 14 Jade Garment Belt Hooks, 11 Jade Ornaments and 58 Jade Sword Ornaments were unearthed from the tomb. Some of the most notable pieces are:

- Garment Hook weith Dragon and Tiger Heads: The belt hook is masterfully carved from a single block of translucent pale green nephrite. Its design unfolds dynamically: the hook head takes the form of a tiger's head, while the opposite end morphs into a dragon's head. At the center, an openwork-carved ring becomes the focal point of a dramatic confrontation—gripped in the tiger's claws while simultaneously clasped in the dragon's jaws, creating an eternal tableau of mythical rivalry frozen in jade.
- Jade Garment Belt Hook with Iron Core: This piece of jade belt hook was excavated from the head compartment of Zhao Mo’s inner coffin. Measuring 19.5 cm in length, it features a hook head width of 1.6 cm, tail width of 4 cm, and thickness of 1.2 cm. This exceptional artifact comprises eight pale green nephrite segments threaded onto an iron core that unifies them into a curved hook shape. Critical stability is achieved through iron tenons inserted into the 1st, 4th, and 8th jade segments. Artistically, the hook manifests a mythical fusion: its head morphs into a dragon's head, while the tail transforms into a tiger's head, with the body dynamically synthesizing both creatures into a single hybrid form. Such intricate composite construction—blending multiple jade units with concealed metal reinforcement—represents an exceptionally rare feat of Qin-Han jade craftsmanship, testifying to the Nanyue workshop's technical ingenuity.
- Jade Openwork Disk with Dragon and Phoenix: The Jade Openwork Disk with Dragon and Phoenix, measuring 10.6 cm in diameter and 0.5 cm thick, held profound significance for its owner—excavated directly over the right eye of Zhao Mo's funerary head covering. Carved from yellowish-white nephrite (likely Hotan jade altered by millennia of soil exposure), this masterpiece divides into concentric rings through two circular frames. Within the inner ring, an openwork dragon coils dynamically, its claws and tail extending into the outer ring. There, a phoenix perches elegantly upon the dragon's outstretched forelimb, turning its head to gaze back at the dragon in a moment of silent communion. The phoenix's crest and tail feathers dissolve into scrolling cloud patterns that fluidly fill the outer space. This pendant epitomizes Han jade artistry through its extraordinary fusion of technical mastery and poetic imagination. The intricate openwork carving, harmonious composition balancing mythical creatures within rigid geometry, and emotive interplay between the dragon and phoenix showcase unparalleled craftsmanship. Its perfect synthesis of romantic symbolism and structural precision earned it recognition as a crown jewel of the Nanyue King Museum. The iconic motif was adopted as the museum's emblem and frequently serves as Guangzhou's cultural ambassador in official contexts.
- Jade Ornament with Monster Mask: The jade ornament is masterfully carved from a single block of pale green nephrite. This distinctive artifact integrates a square beast head with an openwork bi adorned with granular motifs. The beast features wide, round eyes and dramatically arched brows, exuding a potent expression. A striking chi-tiger emerges in openwork relief on the left side of the beast's head, its tail curling upward in dynamic motion. Notably, the deliberate absence of any corresponding element on the right side creates an intentional asymmetry, lending the pendant a unique artistic tension rarely seen.
- Ceremonial Jade Pendant Set of Zhao Mo: Ceremonial Jade Pendant Set is a status symbol denoting aristocratic rank. Among the 11 such sets unearthed from the Nanyue King's Tomb, Zhao Mo's set stands as the most opulent one. This magnificent ensemble spans 60 centimeters from chest to knee, comprising 32 exquisitely crafted ornaments in four distinct materials: jade, gold, glass, and jet. Its composition centers on four principal jade bi and huang arranged vertically, interconnected by an artful arrangement of jade figurines, jade beads, blue glass beads, black jet beads, gold beads, a miniature jade vase, and a finely carved jade animal mask. The cascade culminates in a jade interlocking ring at the terminus.
- Jade Sword Ornaments: The Tomb of Nanyue King yielded 58 Jade Sword Ornaments—the largest such collection ever discovered in a Han-era tomb. These artifacts were distributed across two chambers: 15 in the main coffin chamber and 43 in the western side chamber. Most feature high-relief carvings depicting sinuous dragons, chi-tiger, and auspicious beasts, showcasing extraordinary diversity in design, ingenious compositions, and masterful craftsmanship that represents the zenith of Han dynasty sword ornament artistry. A complete set of jade-adorned sword fittings comprises four distinct components arranged sequentially along the weapon: pommel, guard, slide and chape.
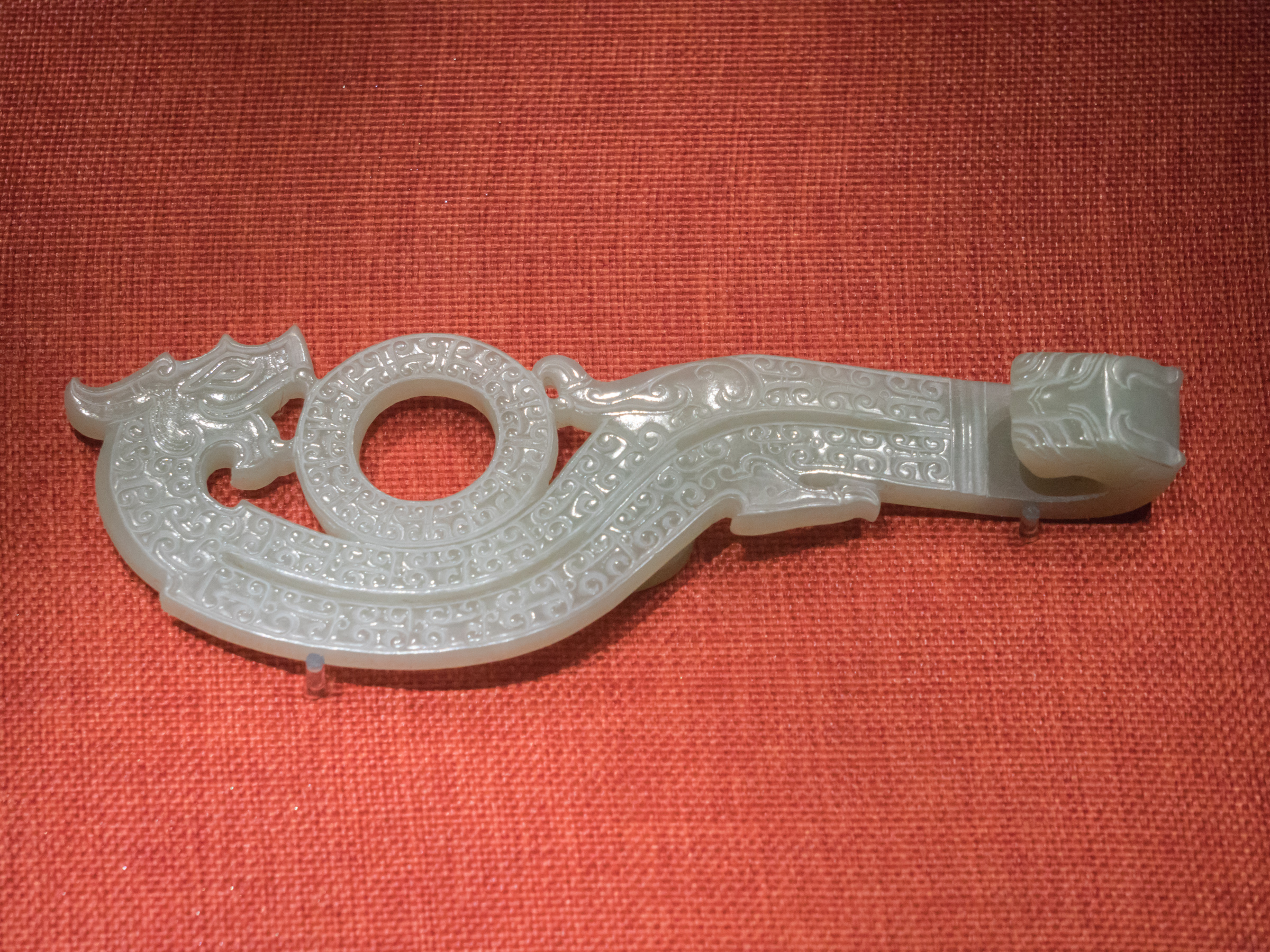
Garment Hook weith Dragon and Tiger Heads

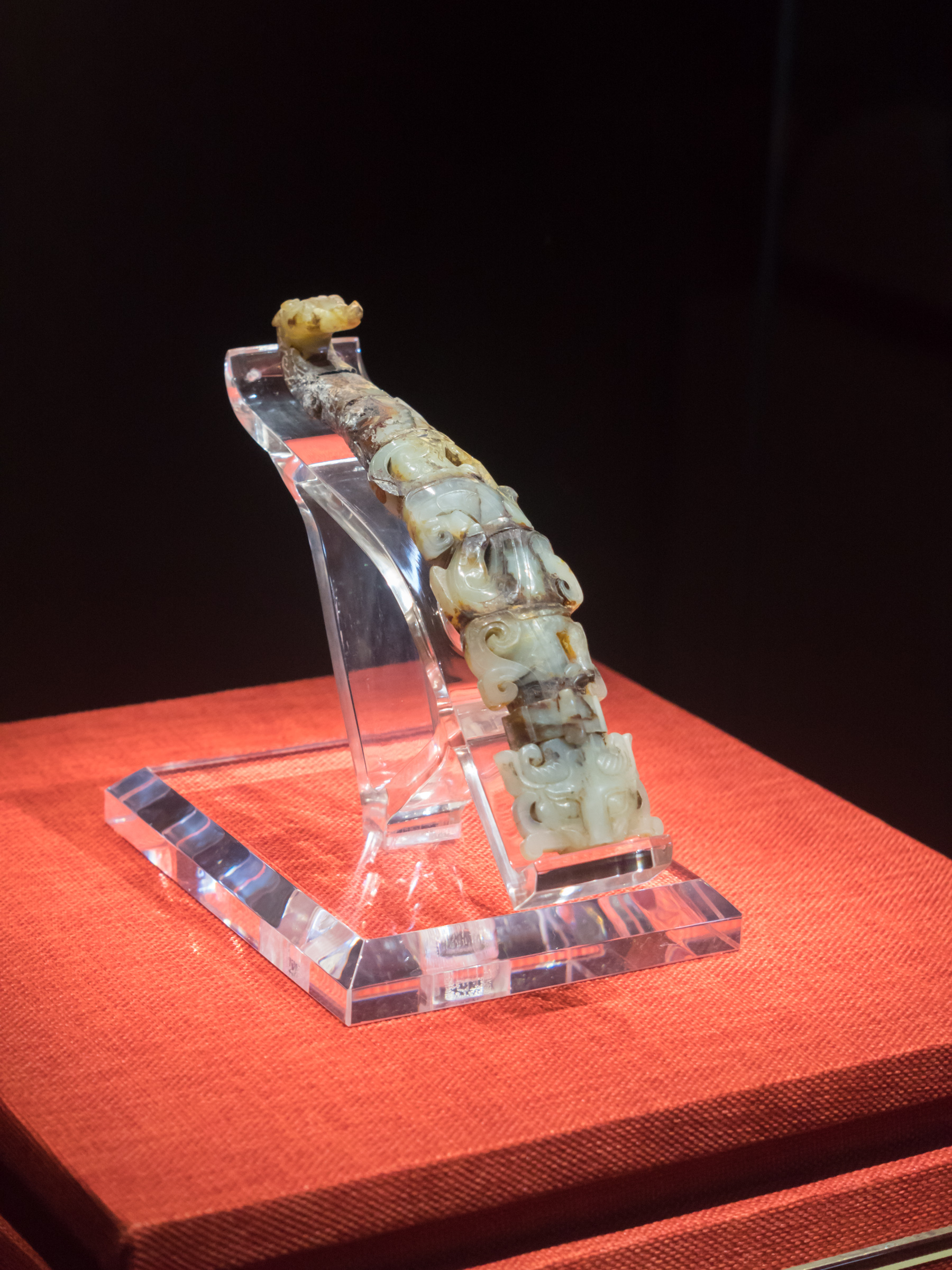
Jade Garment Belt Hook with Iron Core

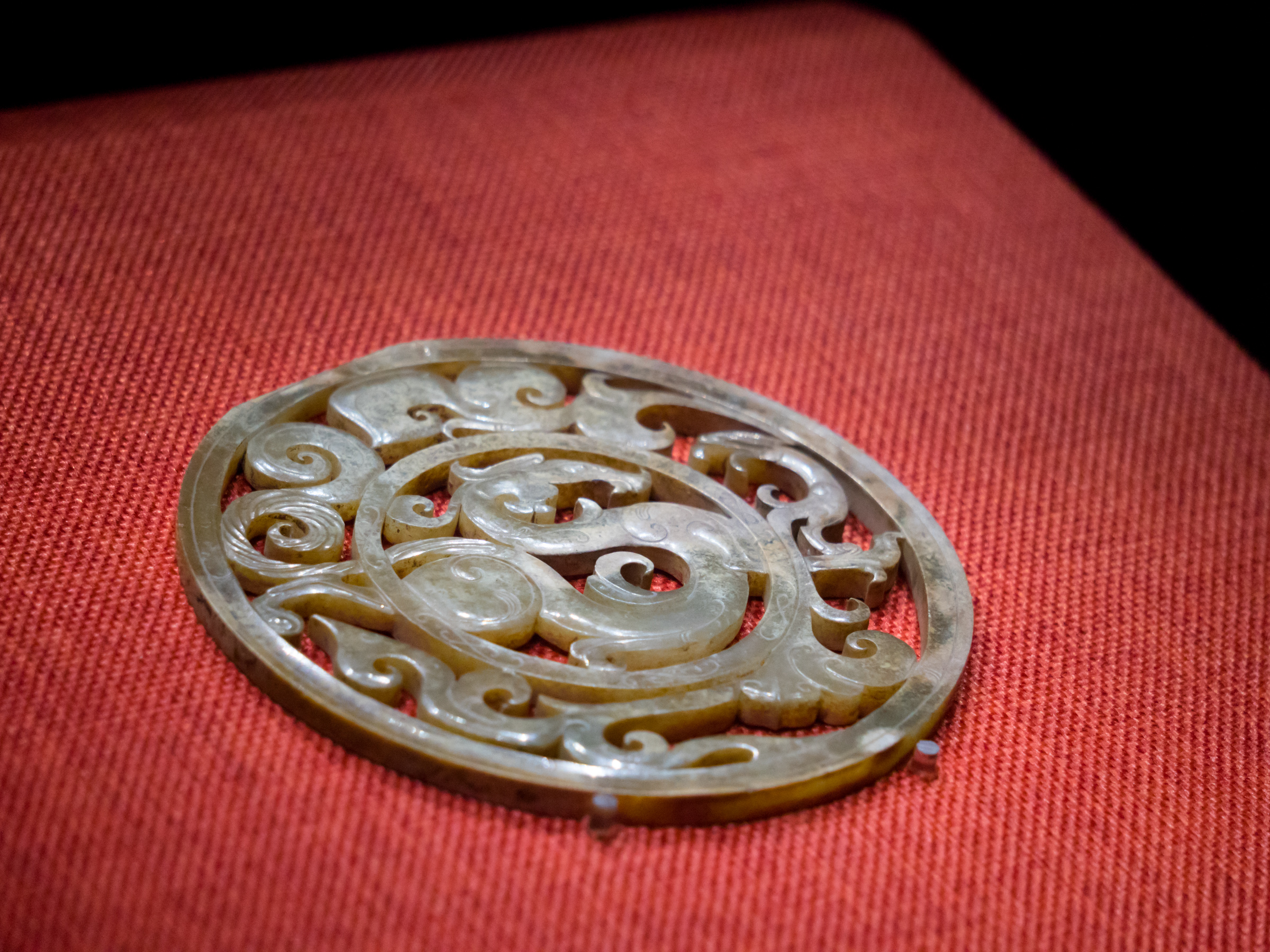
Jade Openwork Disk with Dragon and Phoenix

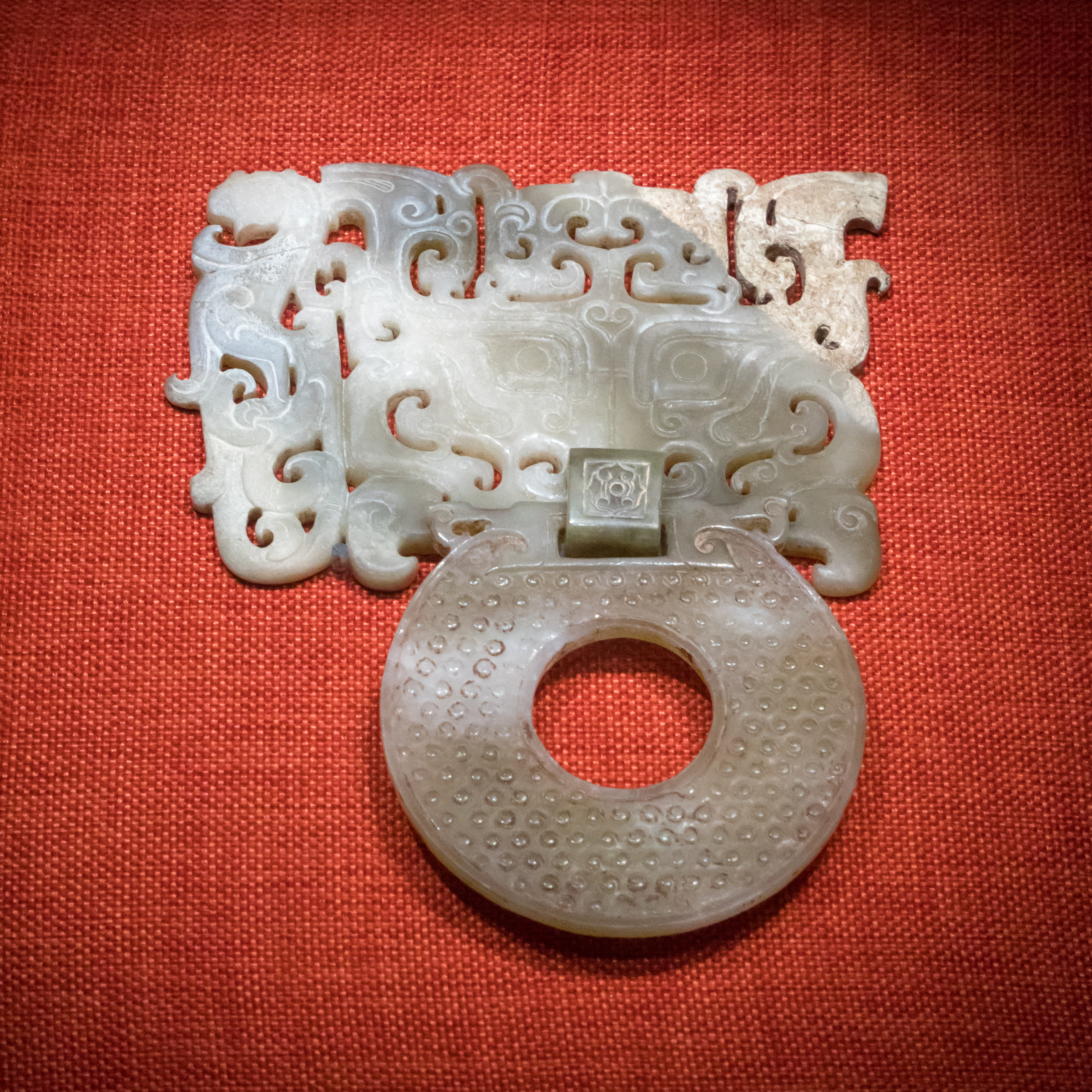
Jade Ornament with Monster Mask

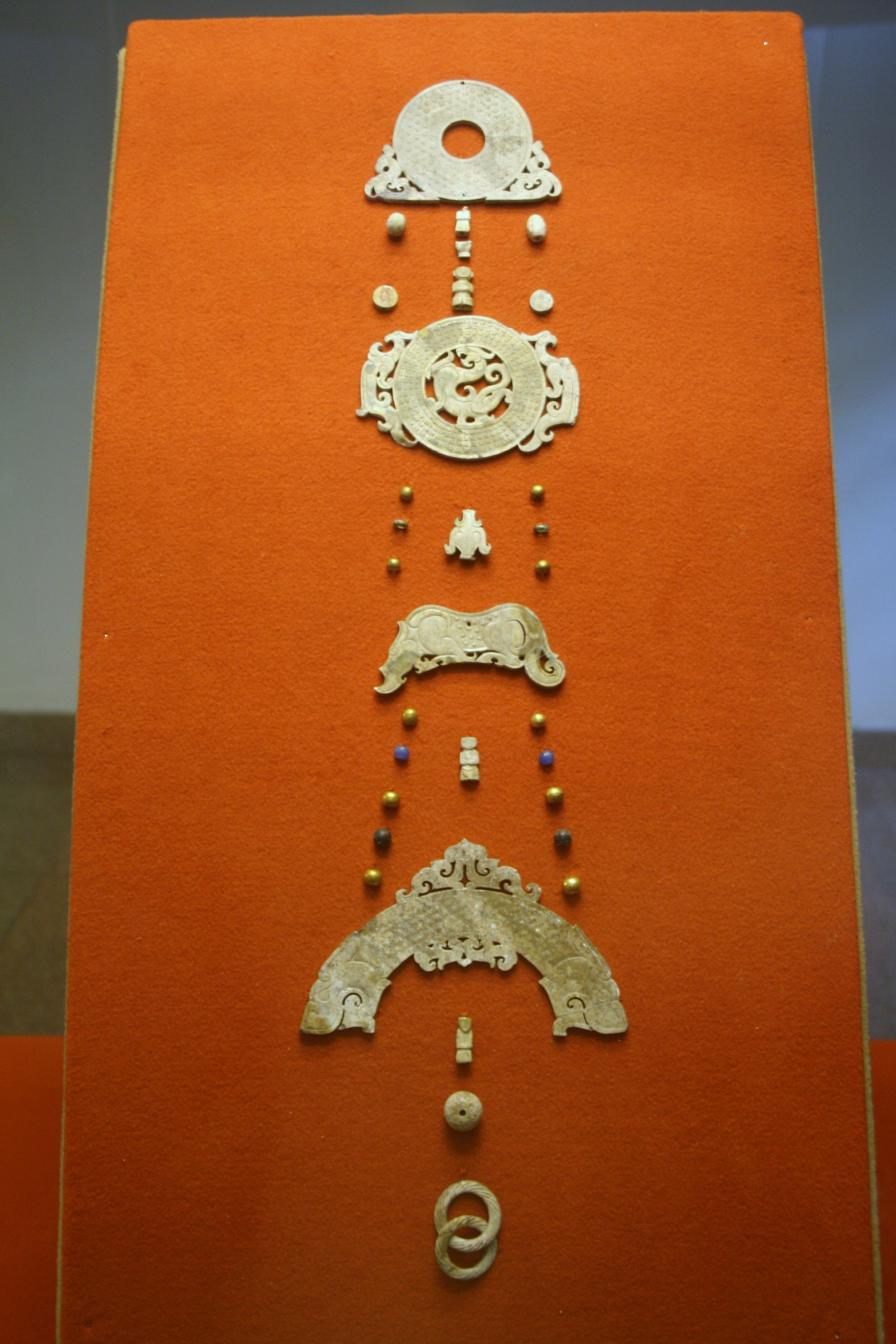
Ceremonial Jade Pendant Set of Zhao Mo

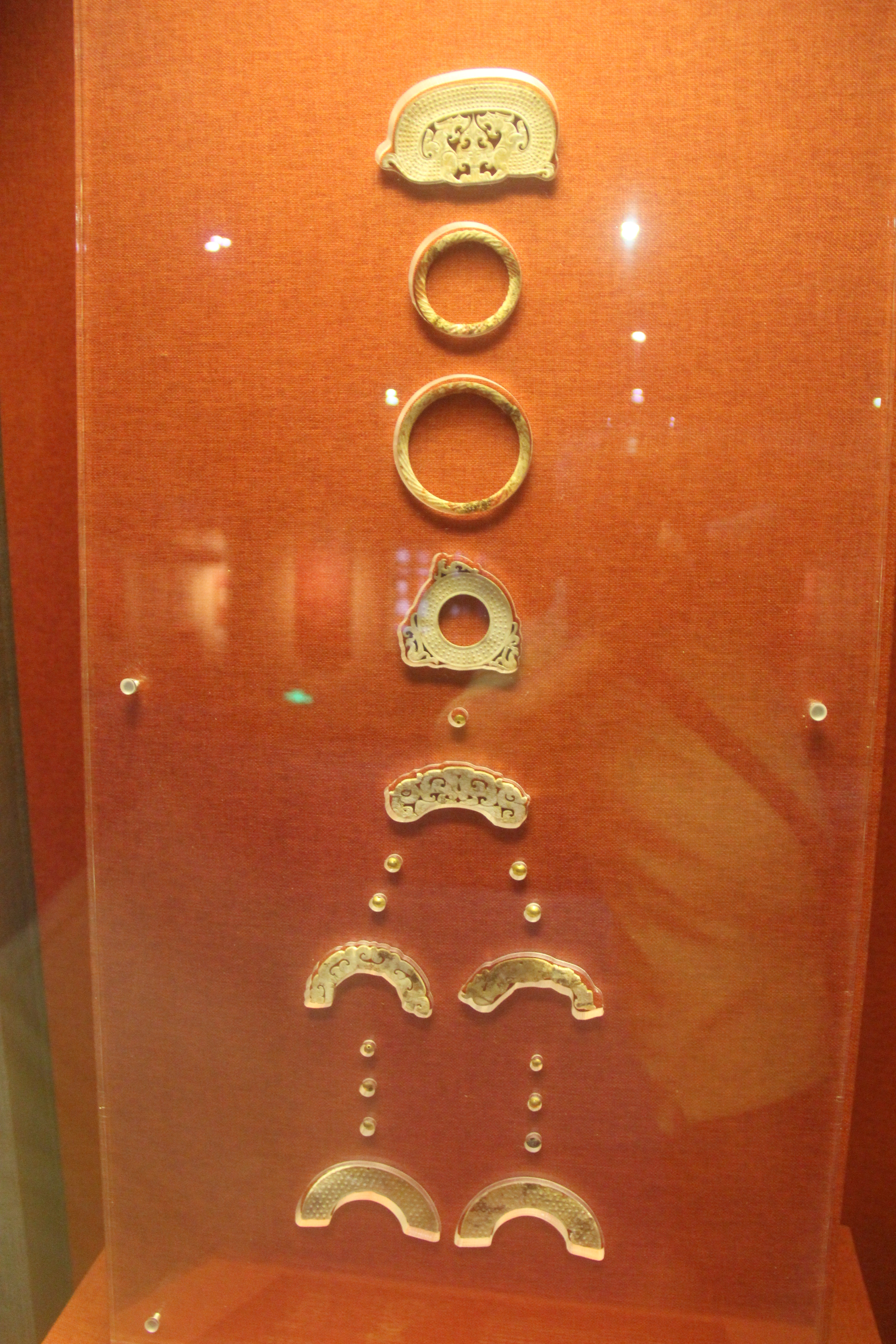
Ceremonial Jade Pendant Set A of "the Right Concubine"

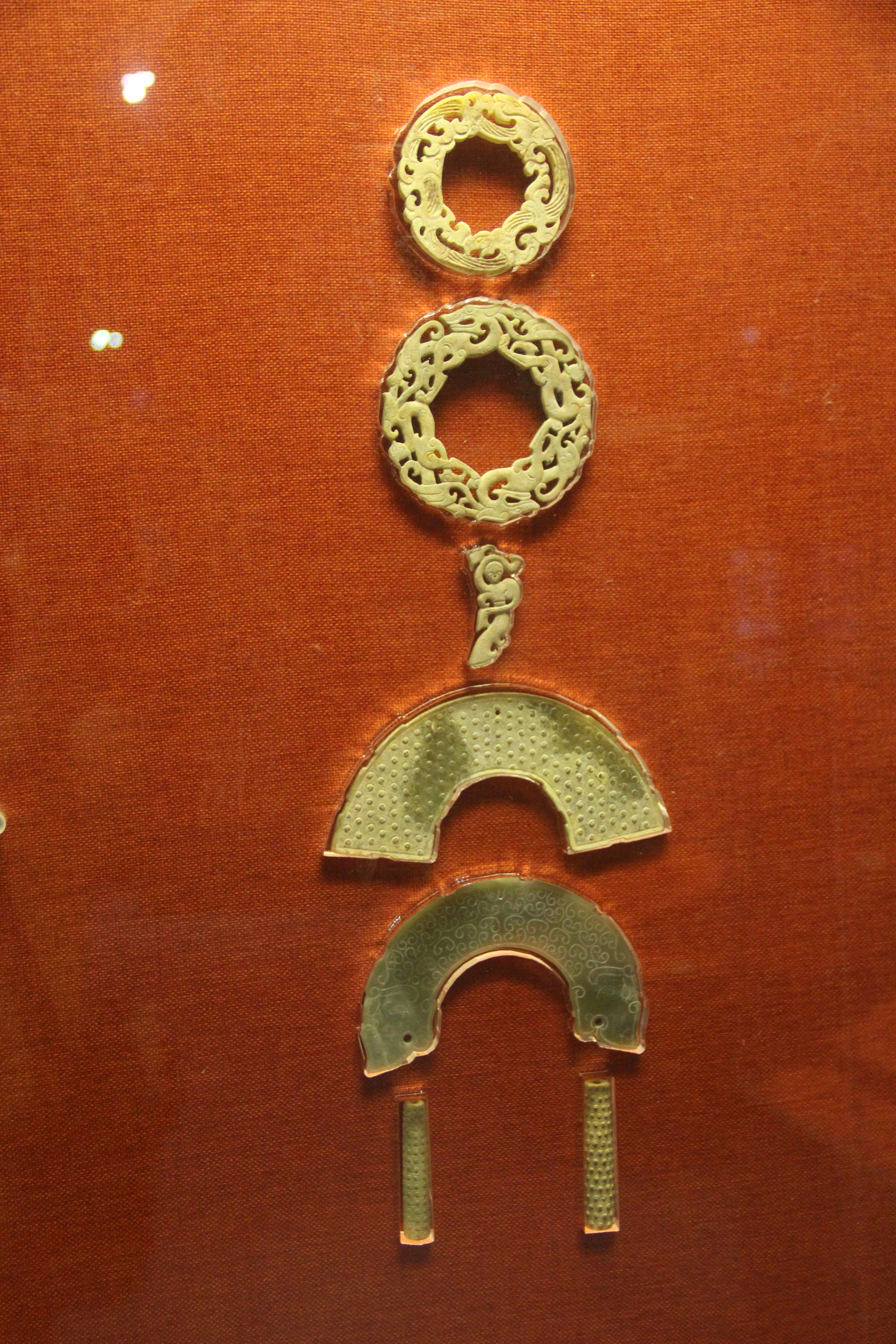
Ceremonial Jade Pendant Set B of "the Right Concubine"

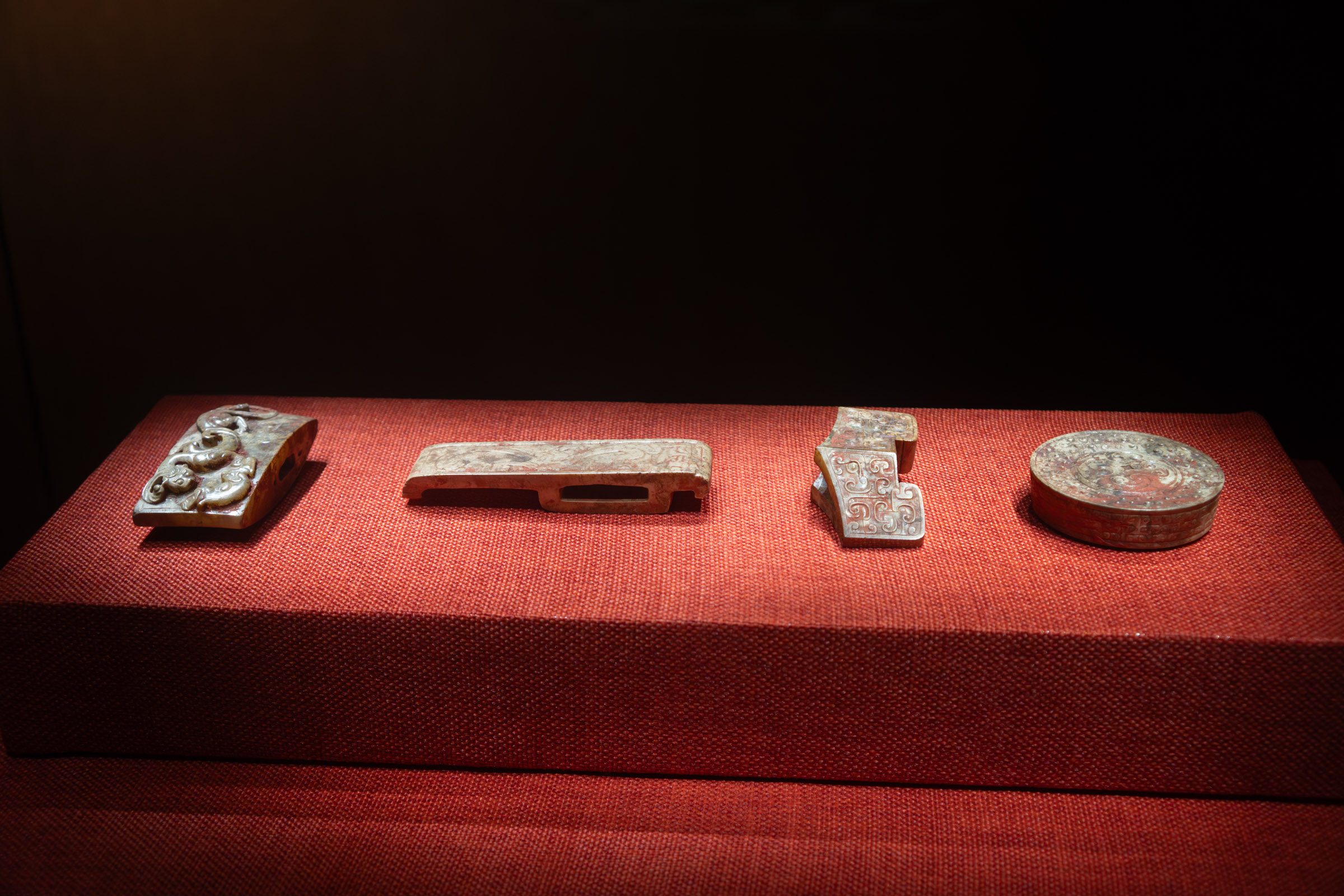
A complete set of Jade Sword Ornaments from left to right: pommel, guard, slide and chape.

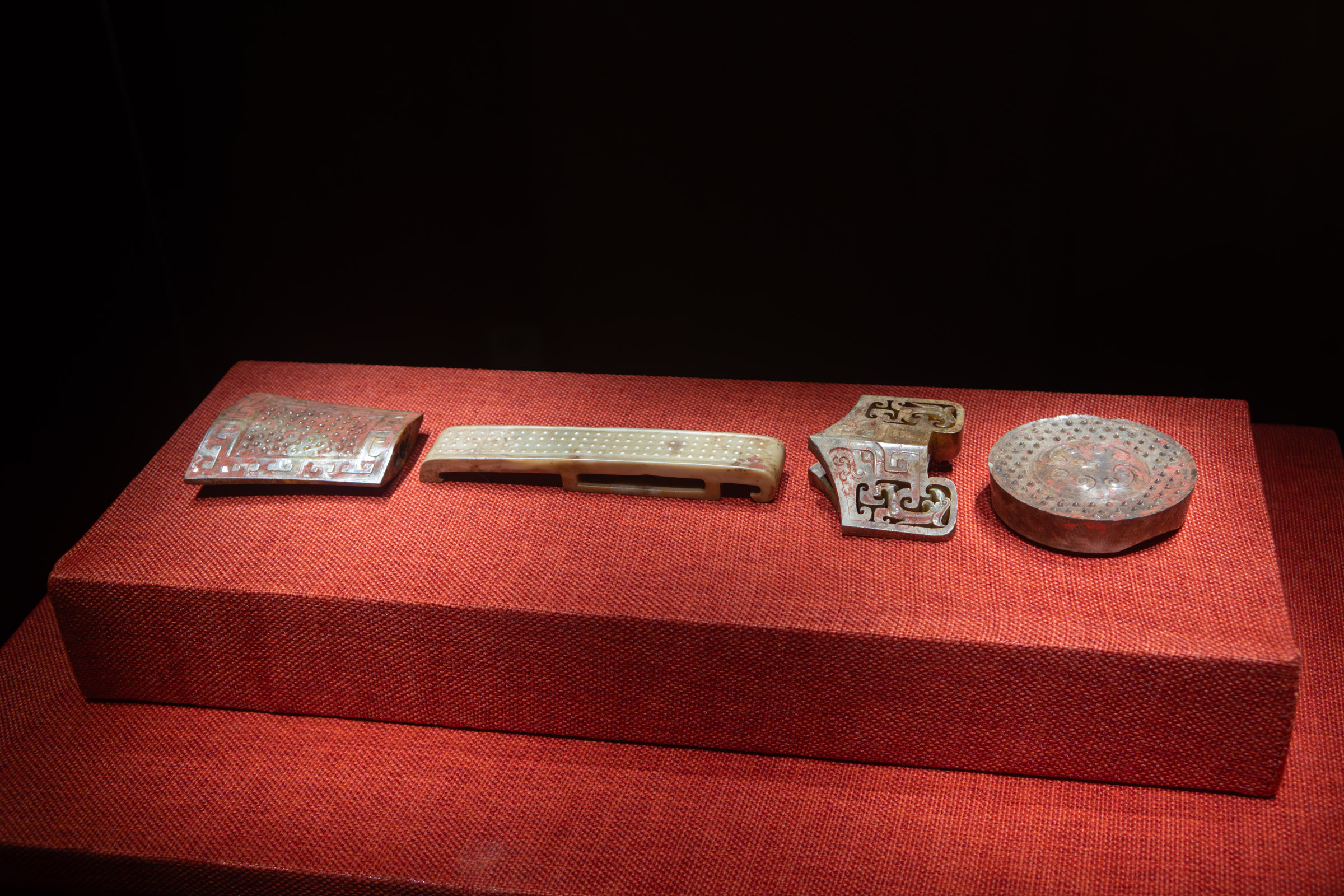
Another complete set of Jade Sword Ornaments

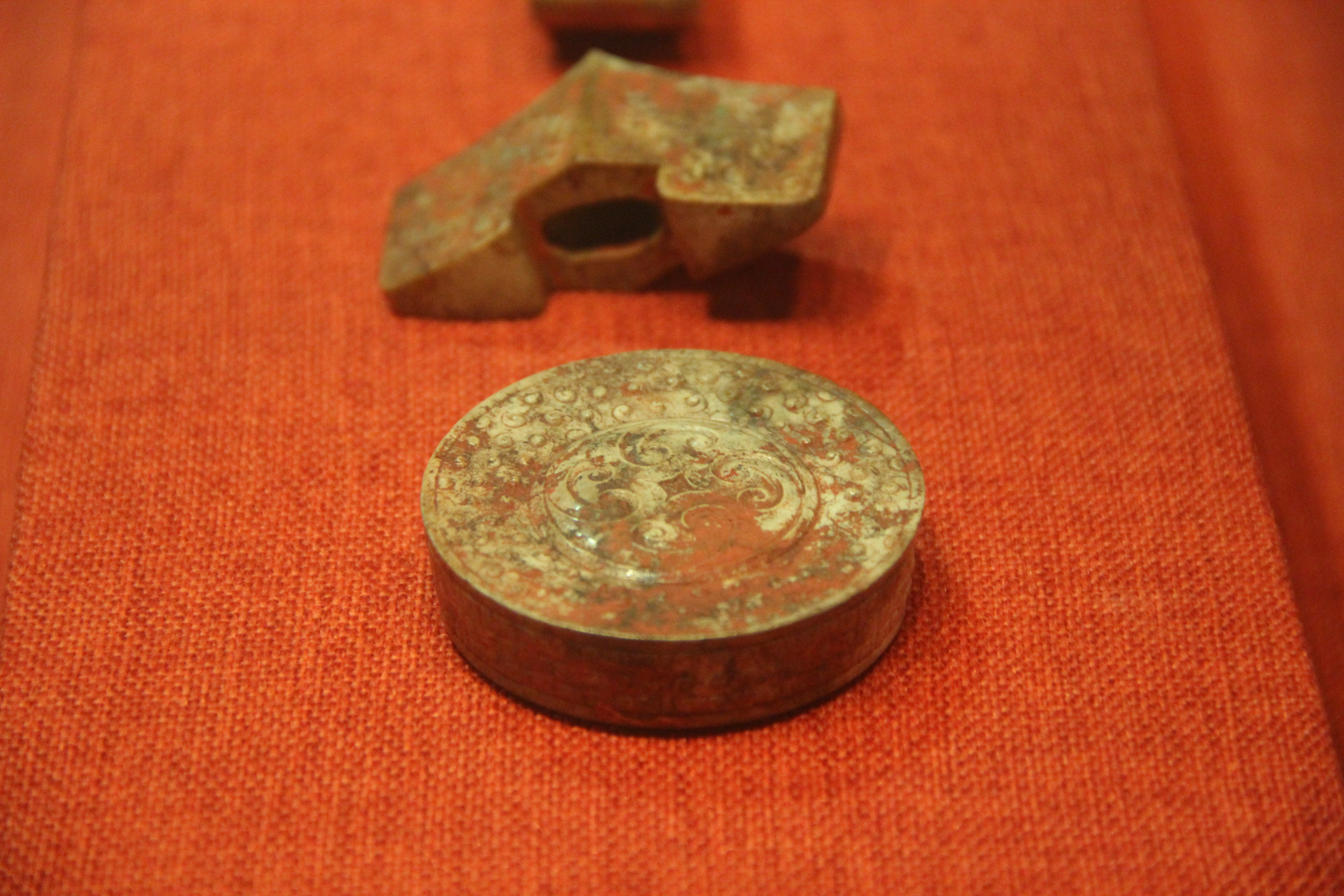
Jade Sword Pommel

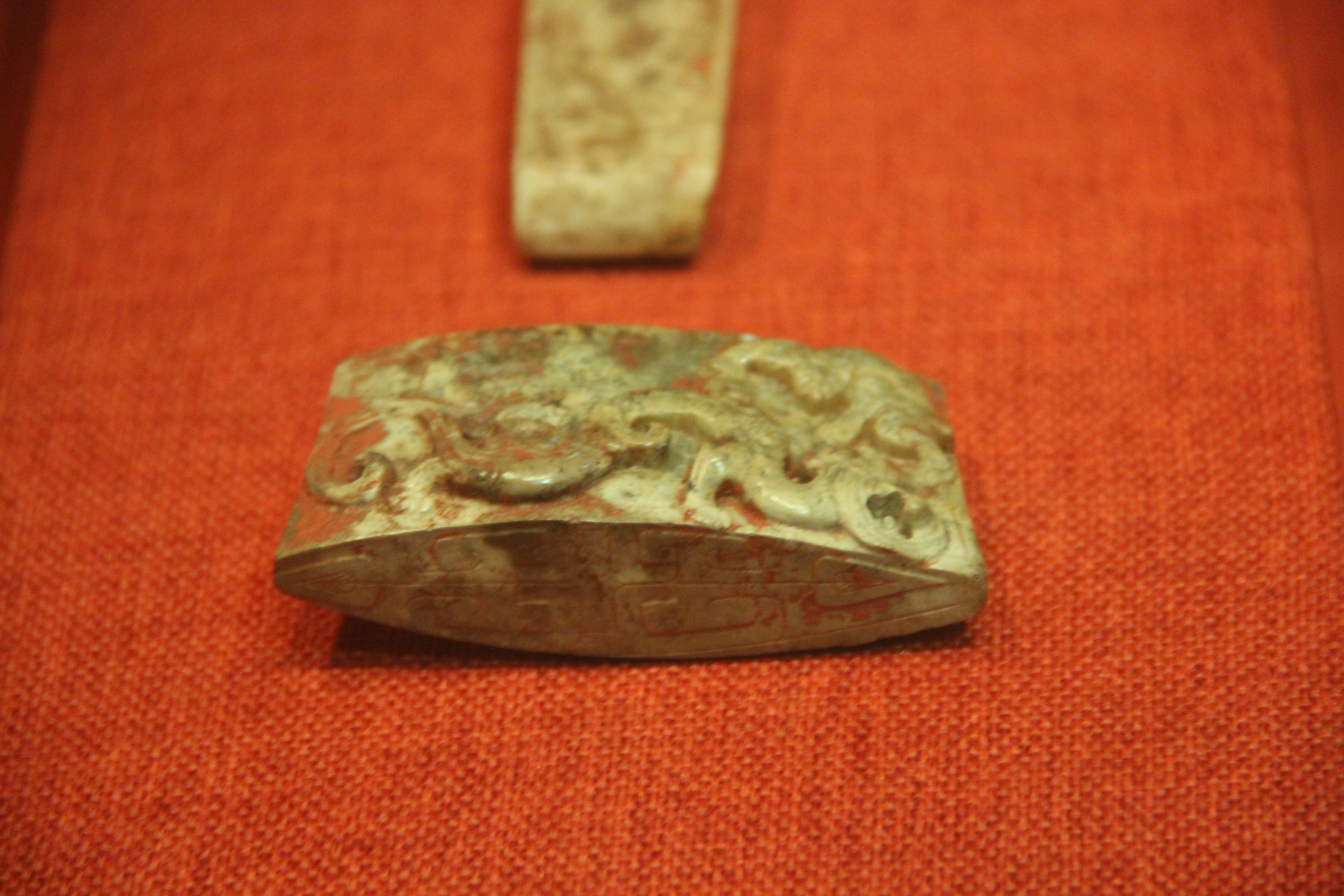
Jade Sword Chape

==== Weapons Chariots and Harness ====
Zhao Tuo, founder of the Nanyue Kingdom, originally served as a Qin dynasty general who led the military conquest of the Lingnan region. Naturally, the Nanyue Kingdom inherited significant military capabilities from its Qin predecessors. The tomb of the Nanyue King yielded extensive weaponry, with forged iron weapons constituting nearly half of the assemblage—demonstrating that the Nanyue Kingdom had fully entered the Iron Age in weapons technology.

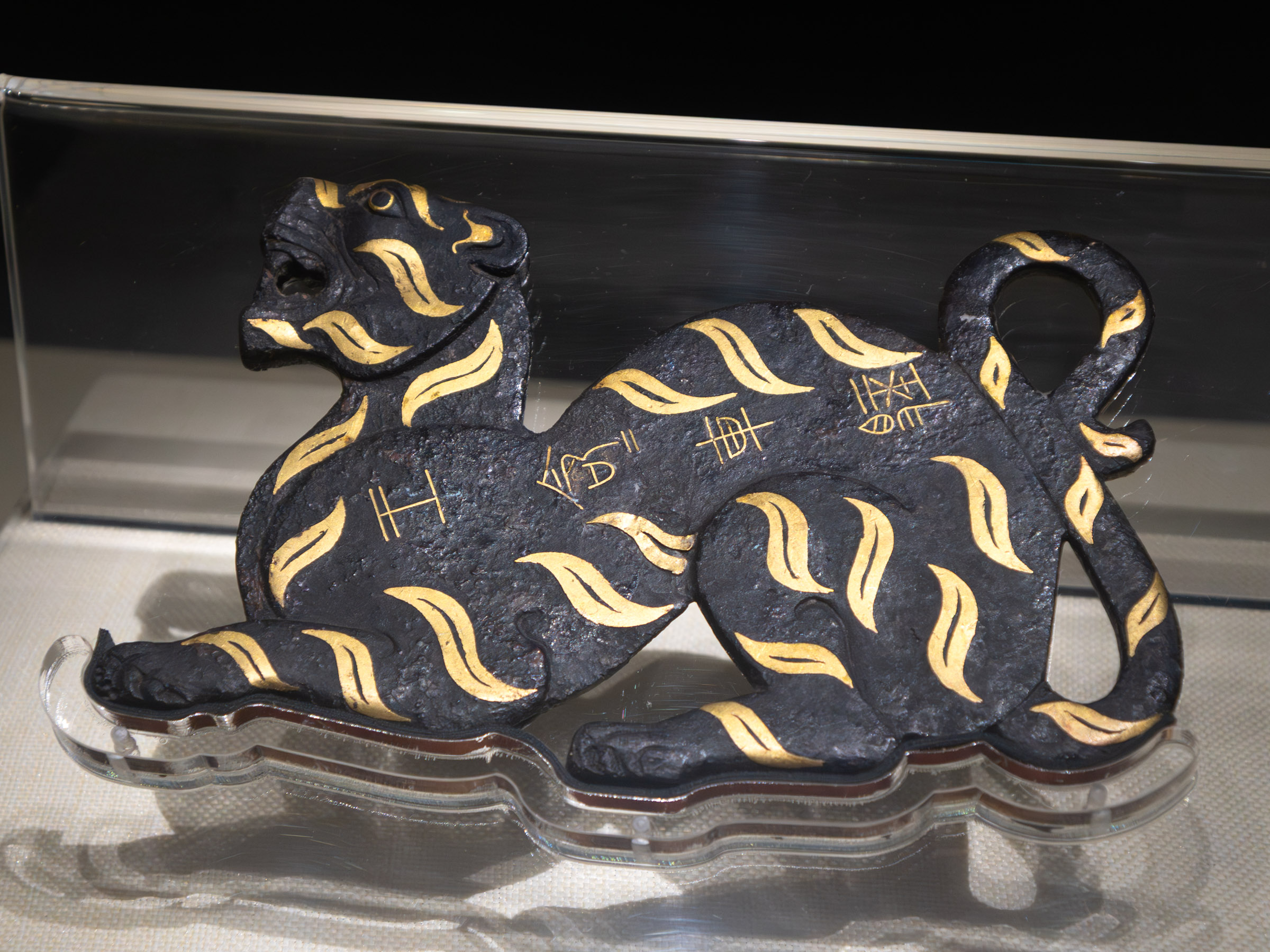
Tiger-shaped Jie

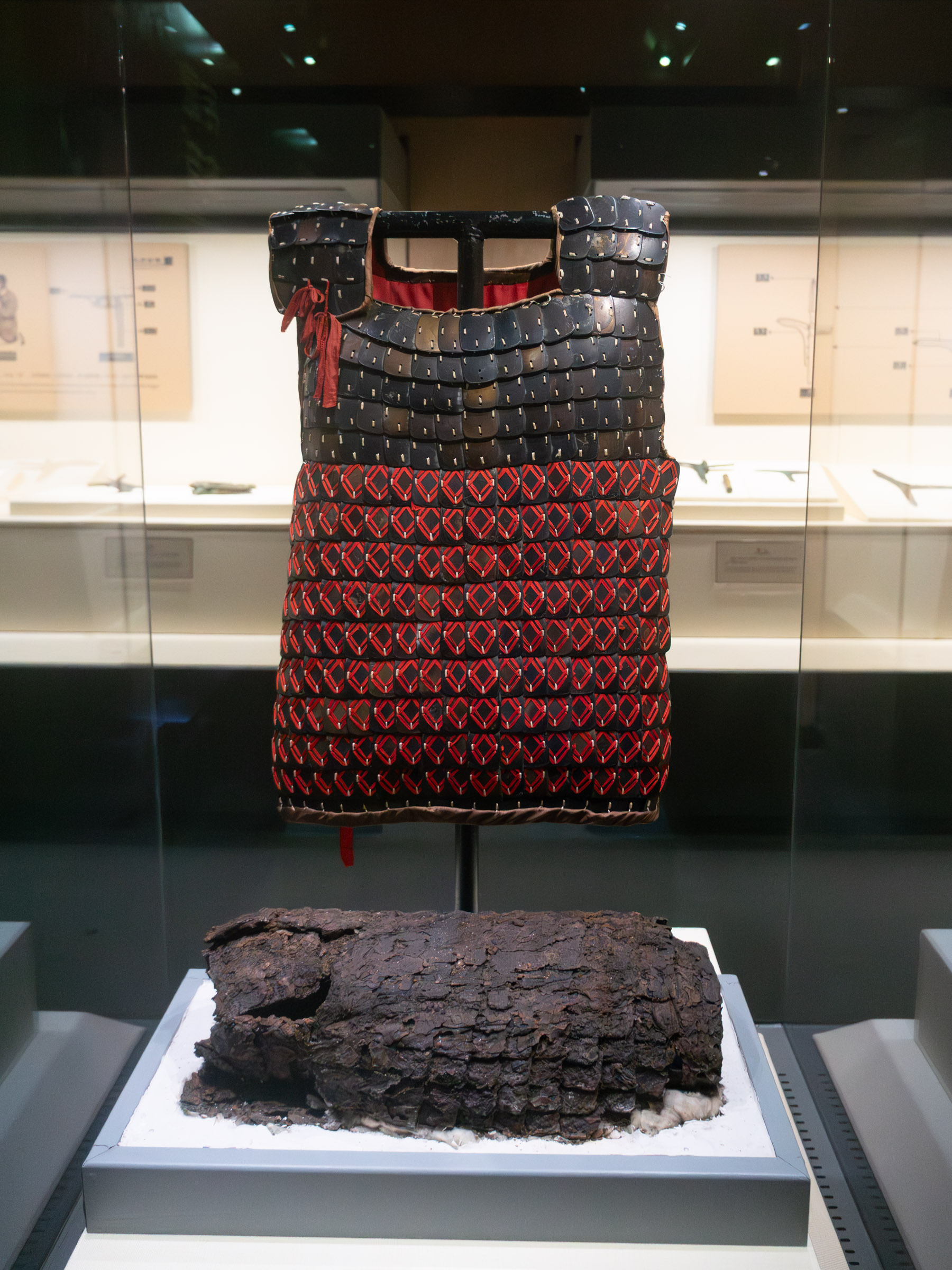
Iron Armor and its reconstructed replica

- Tiger-shaped Jie: This Jie (节), or tally, excavated from the western side chamber of the Nanyue King's Tomb stands as a masterwork of ancient military-diplomatic credentials. Cast in bronze and measuring 19 cm long by 11.6 cm high, this crouching tiger-shaped artifact features 60 gold-leaf inlays meticulously pressed into crescent-shaped grooves to replicate fur patterns, while its obverse bears a five-character gold-inlaid inscription "王命命车驲" (the double-line mark beneath the second "命" character indicating reduplication). Among only four extant tiger tallies in Chinese museums, this specimen holds unparalleled significance as the sole example with documented archaeological provenance and the only known gold-inlaid variant. Artistically, the tally's sinuous gold-inlay patterns and calligraphic style exhibit distinctive Chu characteristics from the Warring States period. This stylistic kinship suggests either profound Chu cultural influence on Nanyue or the possibility that the tally itself originated as a Chu relic later repurposed by Nanyue elites.
- Iron Armor: The iron armor excavated from the tomb had severely deteriorated, weighing 9.7 kg and comprising 709 interconnected plates. As the sole surviving Han-era armor in Lingnan, archaeologists prioritized preserving its fragile traces of original lacing patterns, decorative details, fabric edging, and internal lining—deliberately forgoing rust removal. Through meticulous documentation, they spent one month creating an exacting replica. This vest-style armor stands 58 cm tall with a 102 cm chest circumference, featuring no collar, shoulder guards, or lower skirt—characteristics identifying it as lightweight infantry gear. Today, both the corroded original and the scientifically reconstructed replica share a display case, offering visitors a poignant contrast between archaeological reality and historical restoration.
- Iron Swords: Archaeologists recovered ten iron swords near the tomb occupant, with the longest extant specimen measuring 146 cm. When fitted with its pommel and chape, the total length reached 153.6 cm—the longest Han-era sword ever discovered. Severe corrosion, however, has fused these swords inseparably to their scabbards.
- Gilded Bronze Crossbow Triggers: The tomb yielded 15 crossbow triggers, most featuring partial or full gilding. As state-of-the-art ranged weapons of the Qin-Han period, these mechanisms highlight Nanyue's advanced military capabilities.
- Arrowheads: A total of 921 arrowheads were excavated, predominantly iron-shanked with a minority featuring bronze shanks.
- Bronze Ge: Among four bronze Ge unearthed from the tomb, one bears the inscription “王四年相邦仪” (Fourth Regnal Year, Chancellor Yi). The dating corresponds to 321 BCE (fourth "Hou Yuan" regnal year of King Huiwen of Qin), suggesting it arrived with Qin troops during the southern conquest.
- Chariot and Horse Ornaments: Unlike other Han princely tombs with full-sized chariot burials, spatial constraints in the Tomb of Nanyue King necessitated miniature models. While their wooden components decayed, the bronze and jade fittings survived.
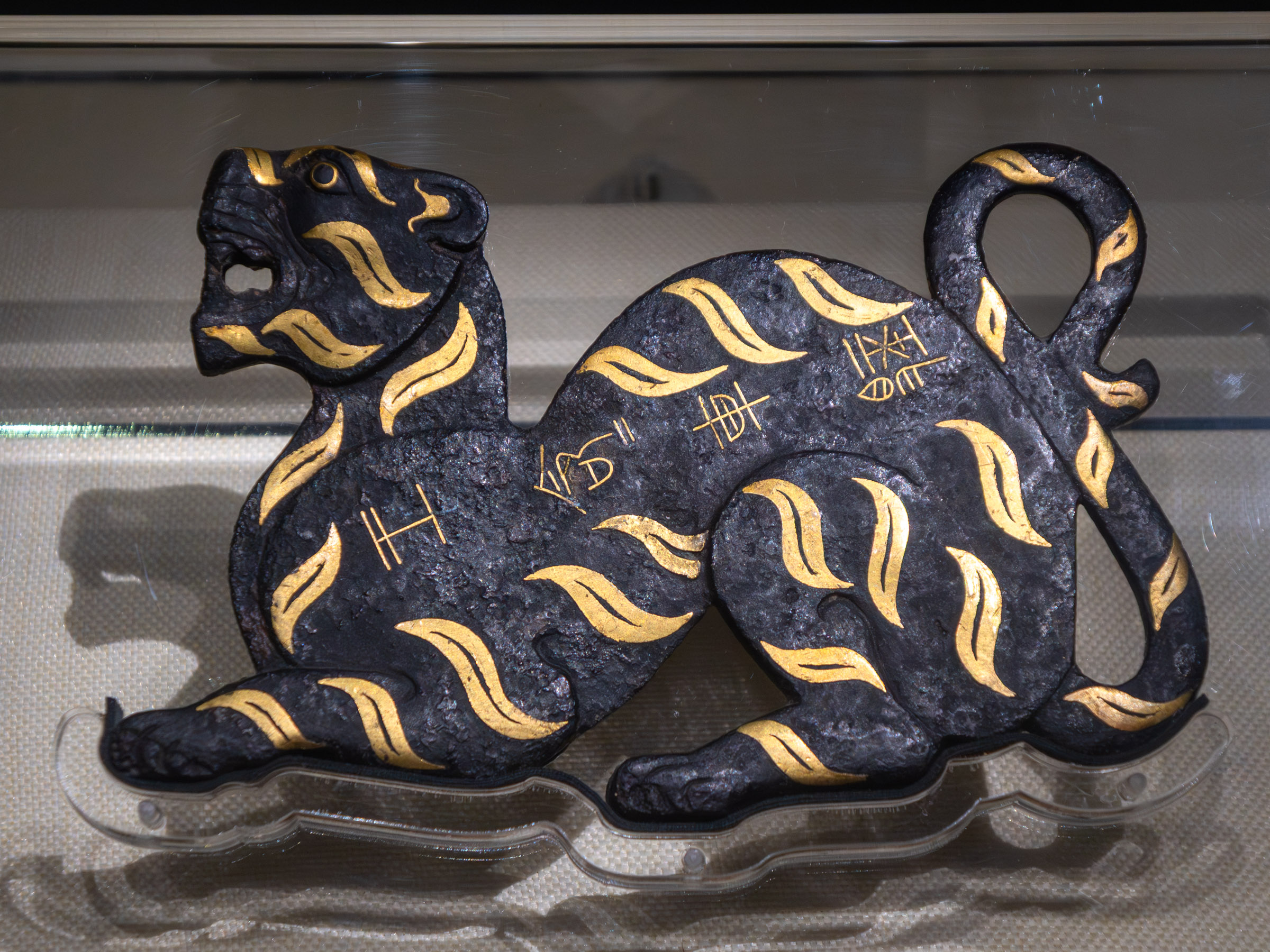
Tiger-shaped Jie

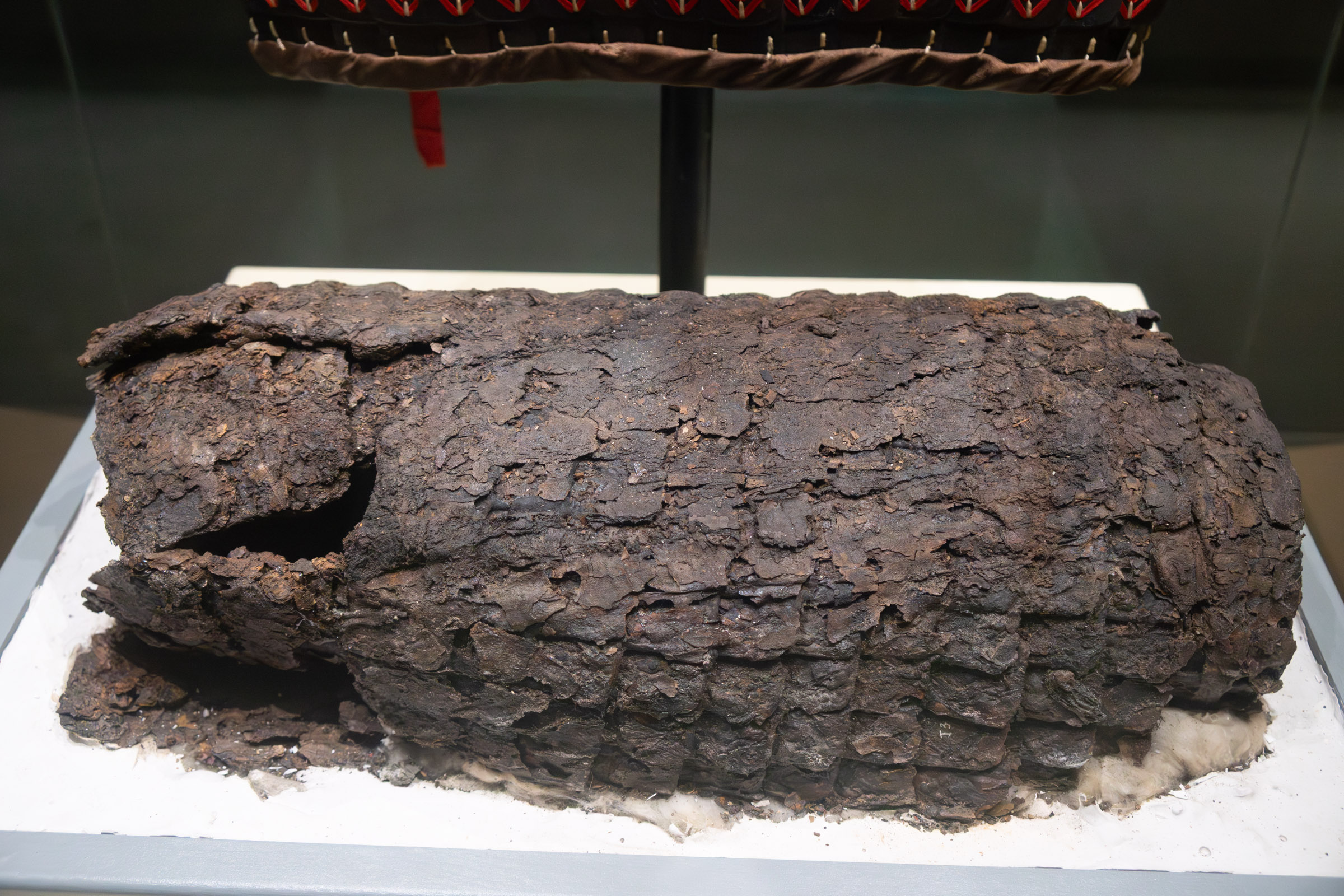
Original piece of the iron armor

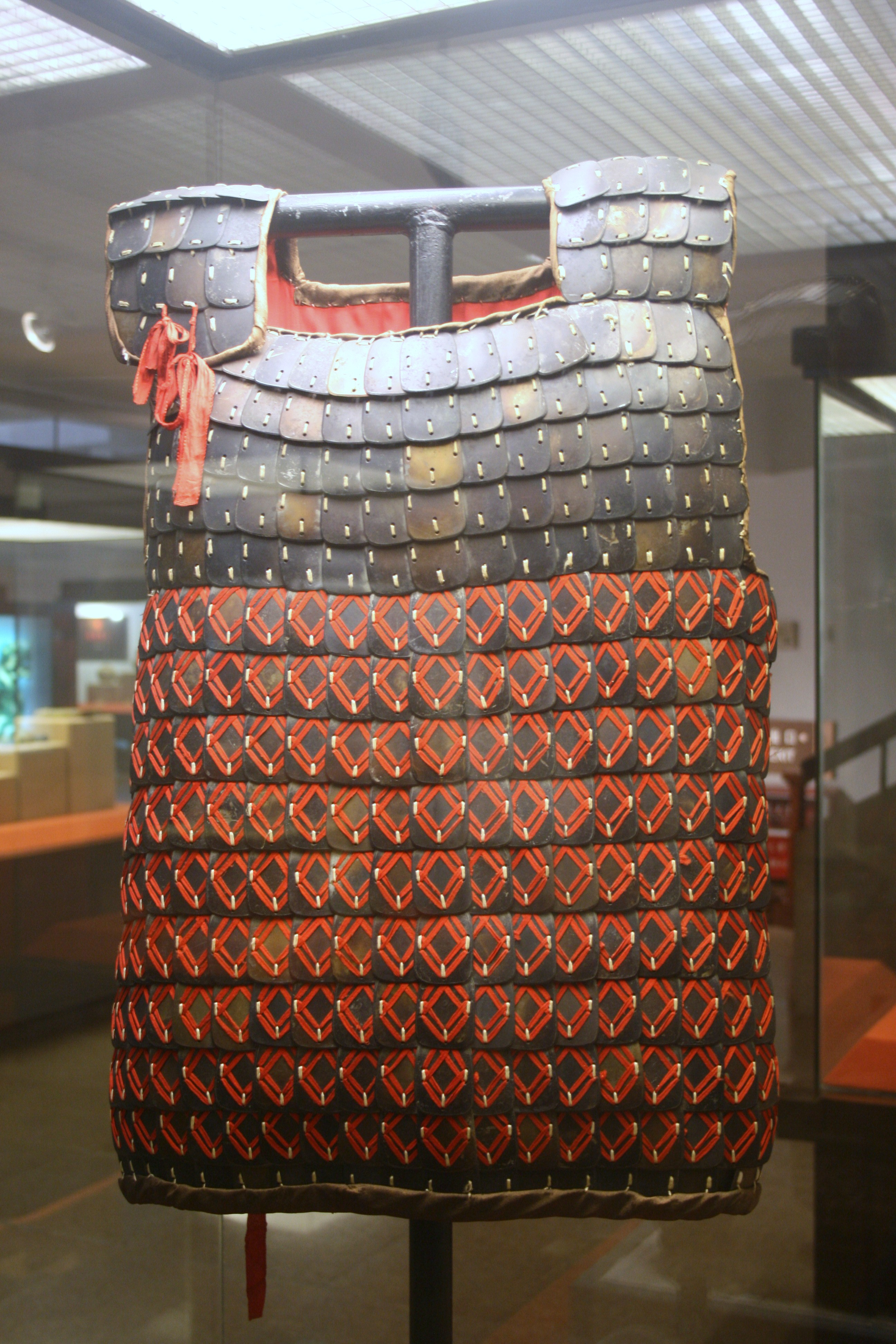
Reconstructed replica of the iron armor

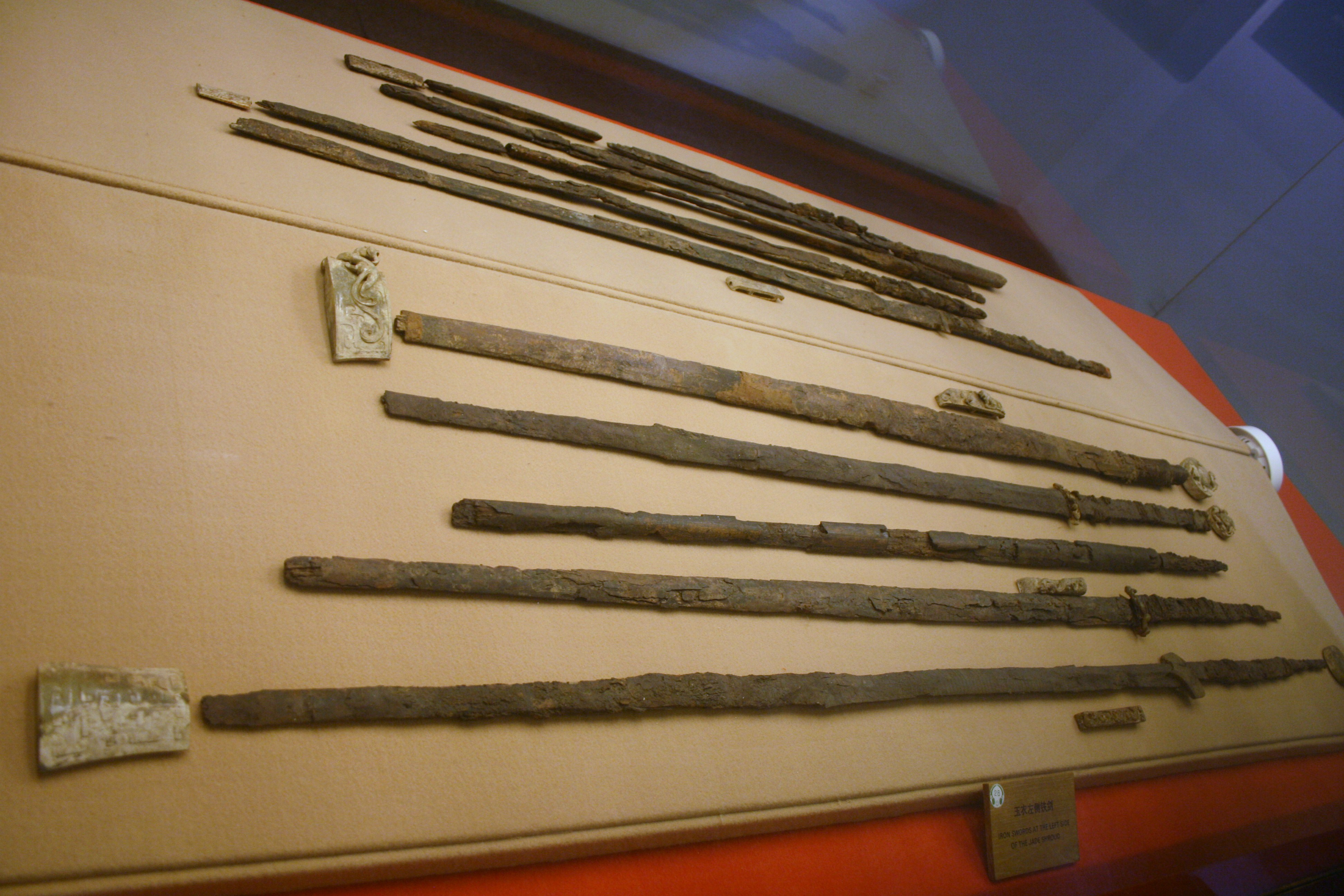
Iron Swords

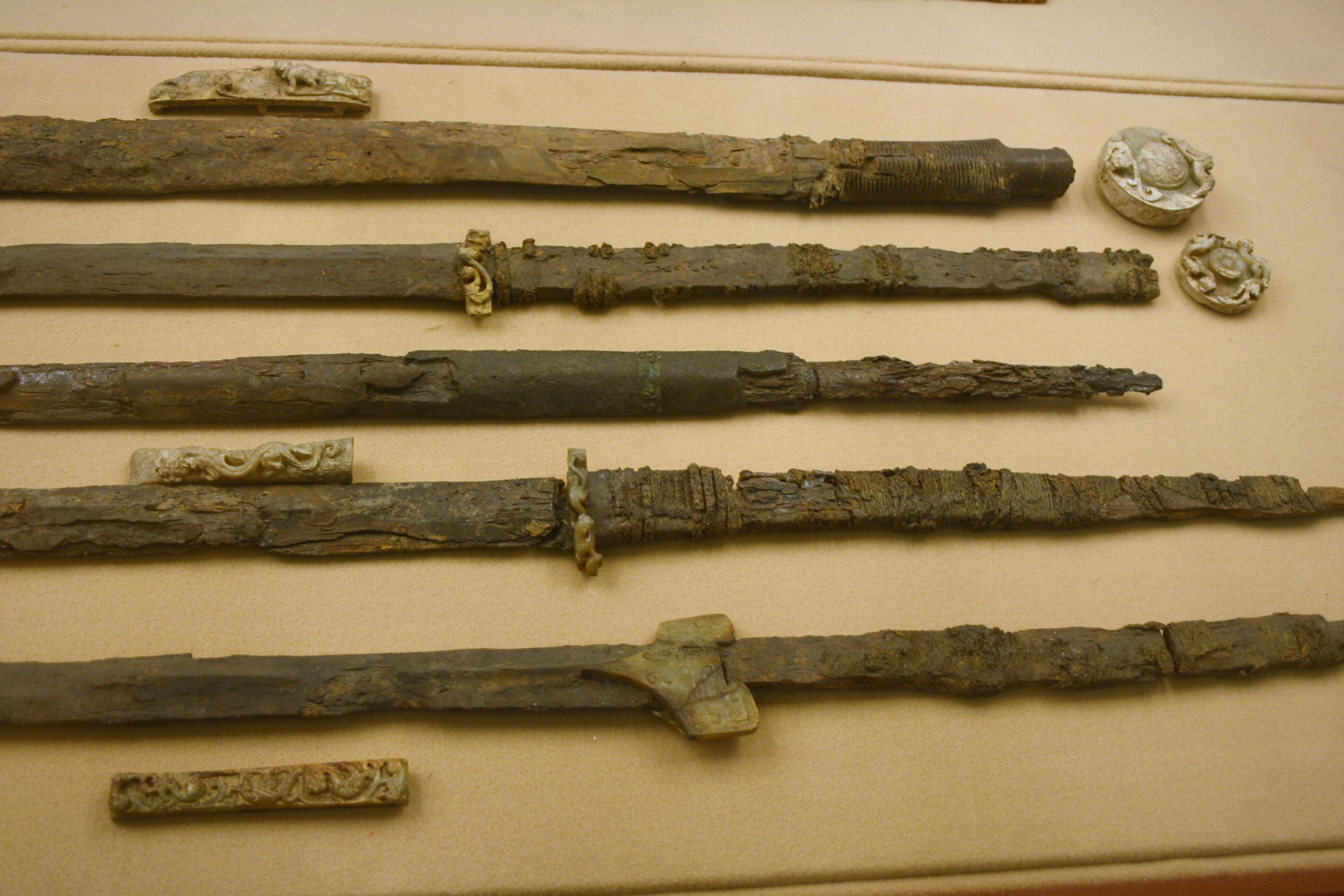
Iron Swords and Jade Sword Ornaments

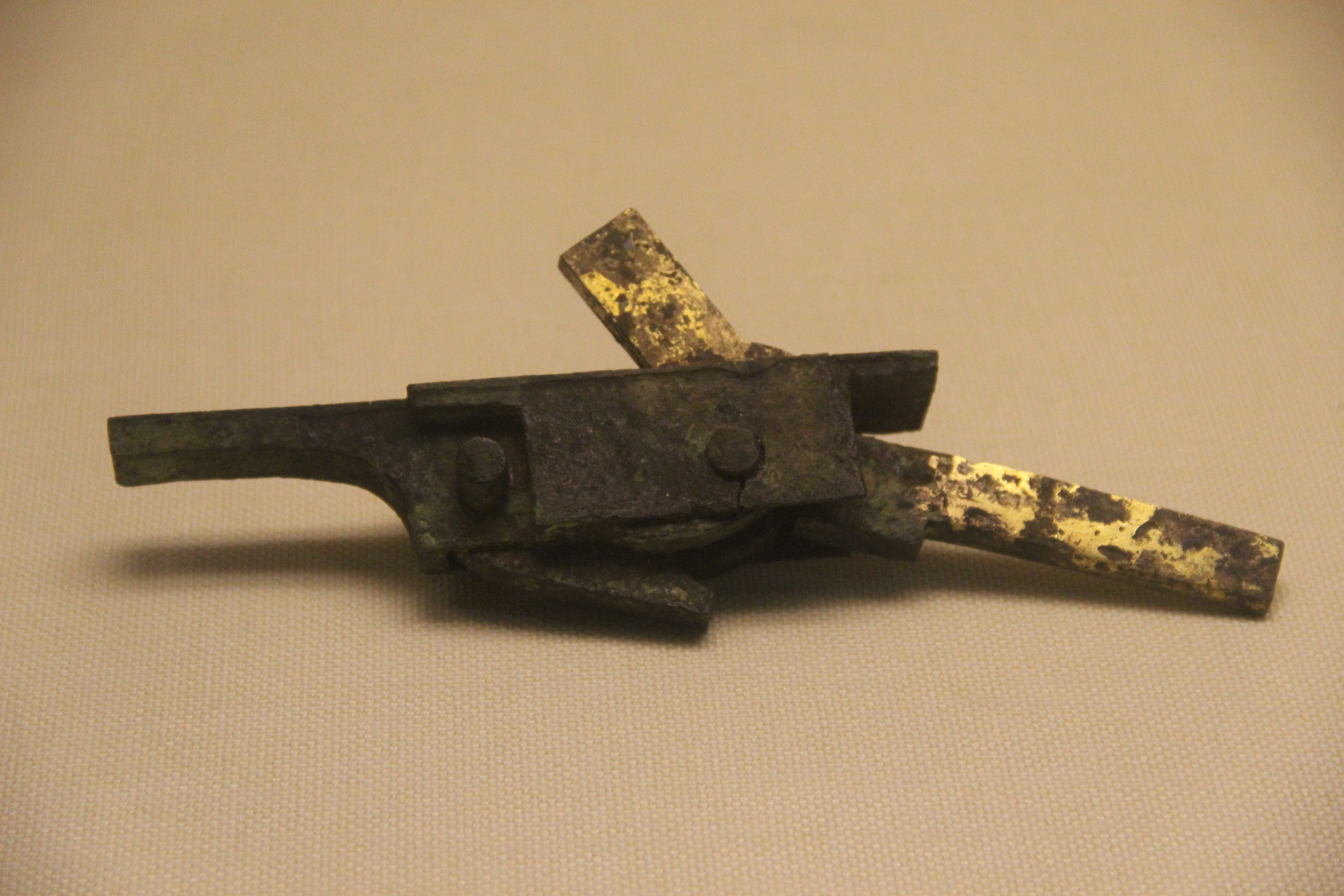
Gilded Bronze Crossbow Triggers

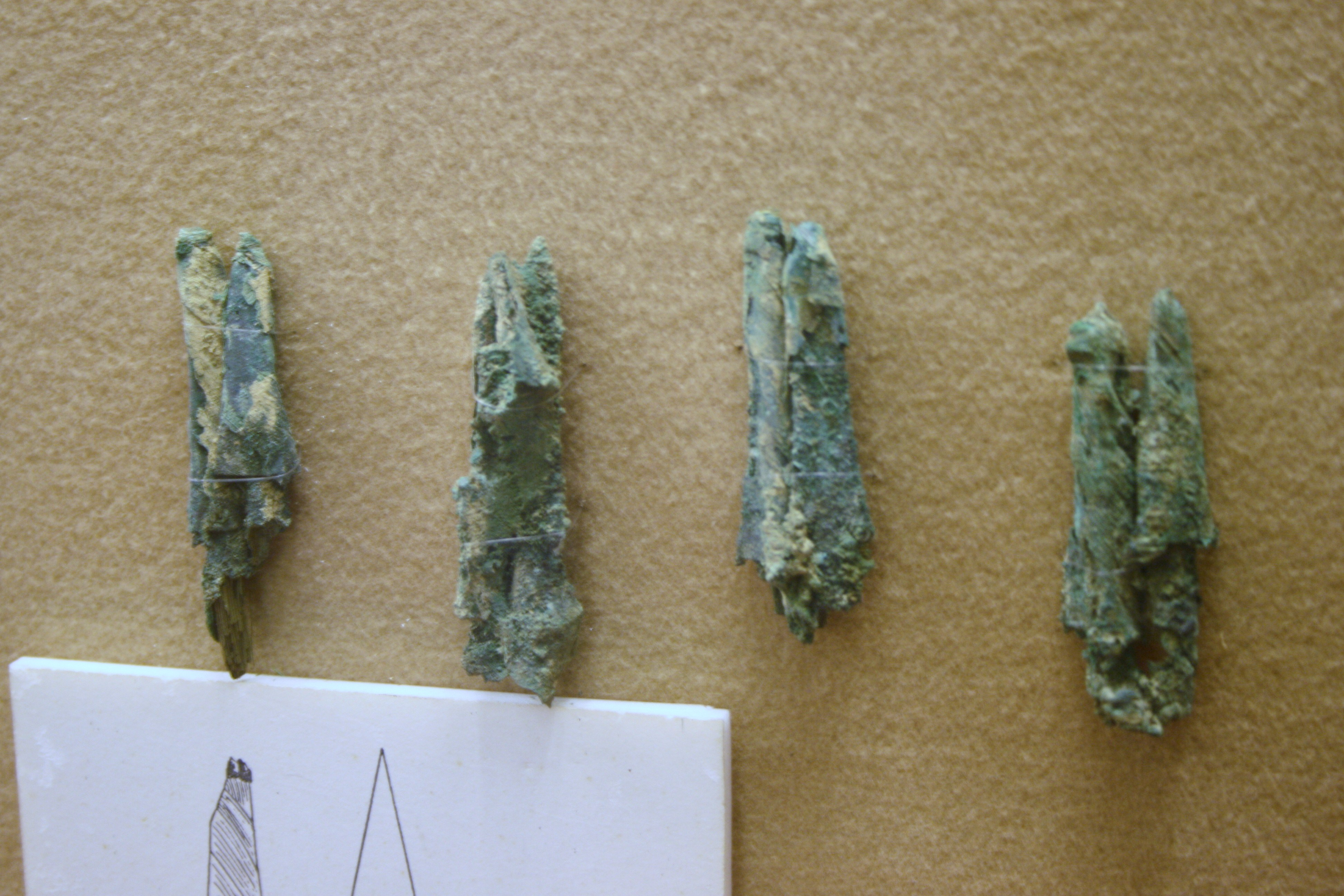
Arrowheads

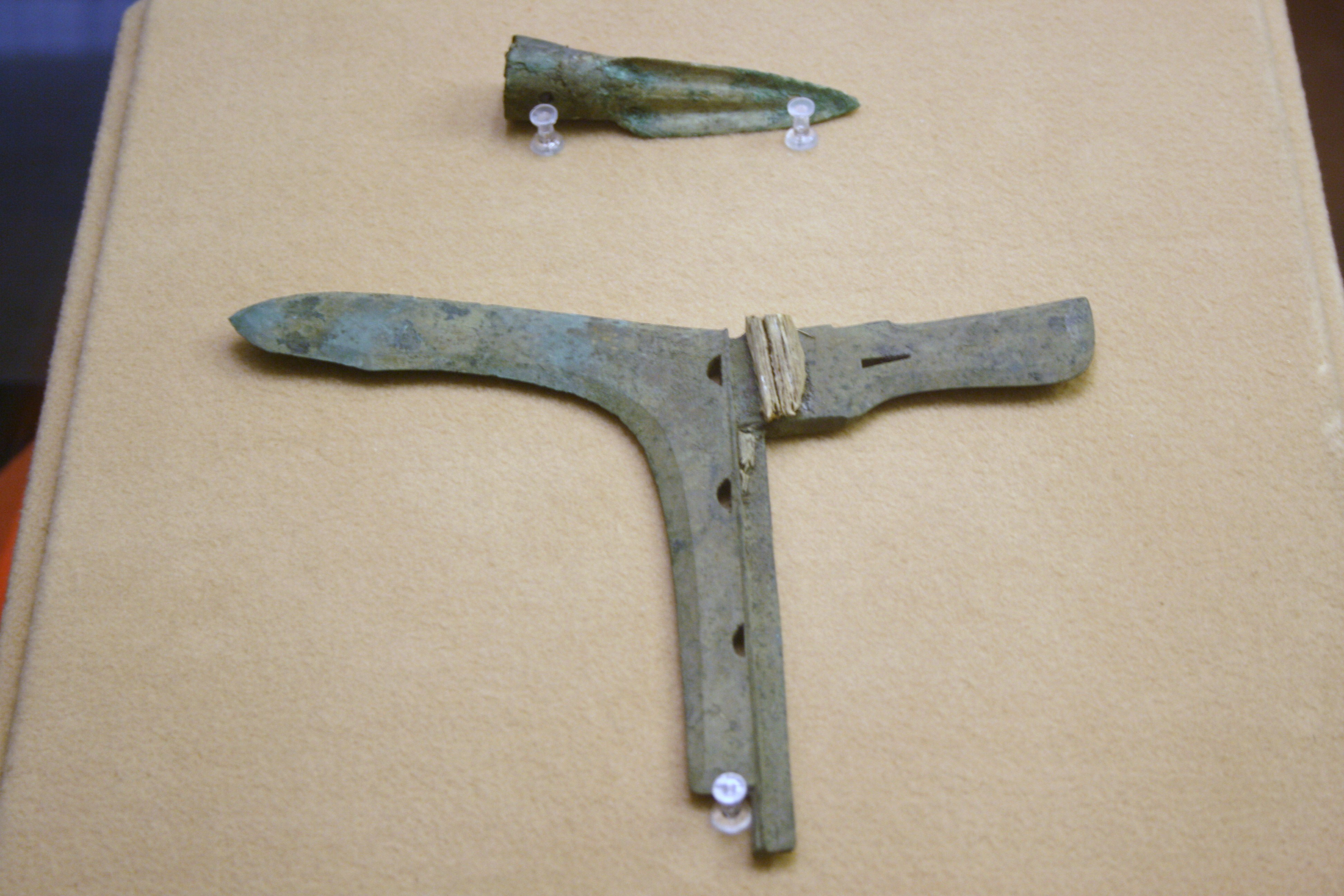
“王四年相邦仪” Bronze Ge

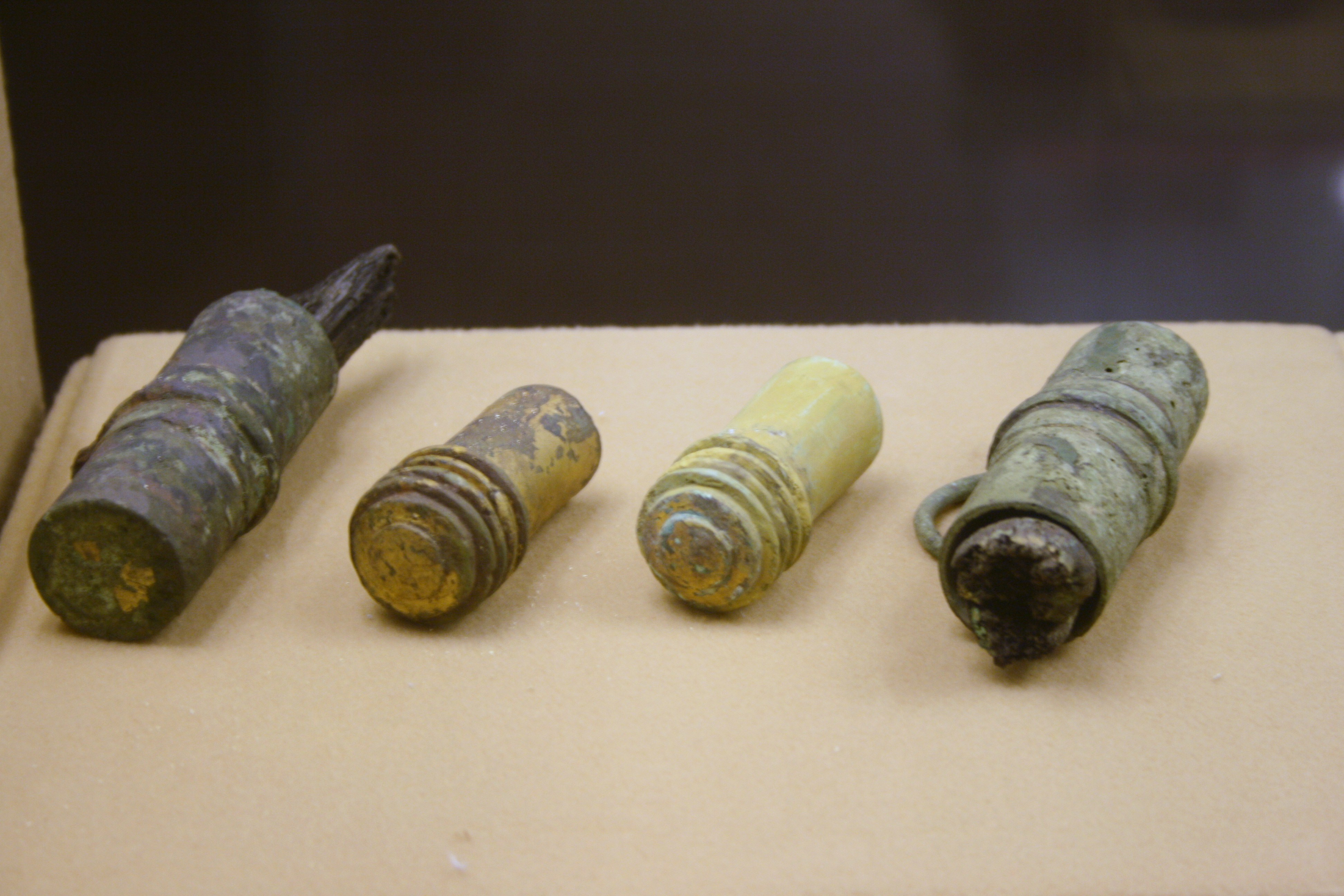
Bronze Chariot Ornaments

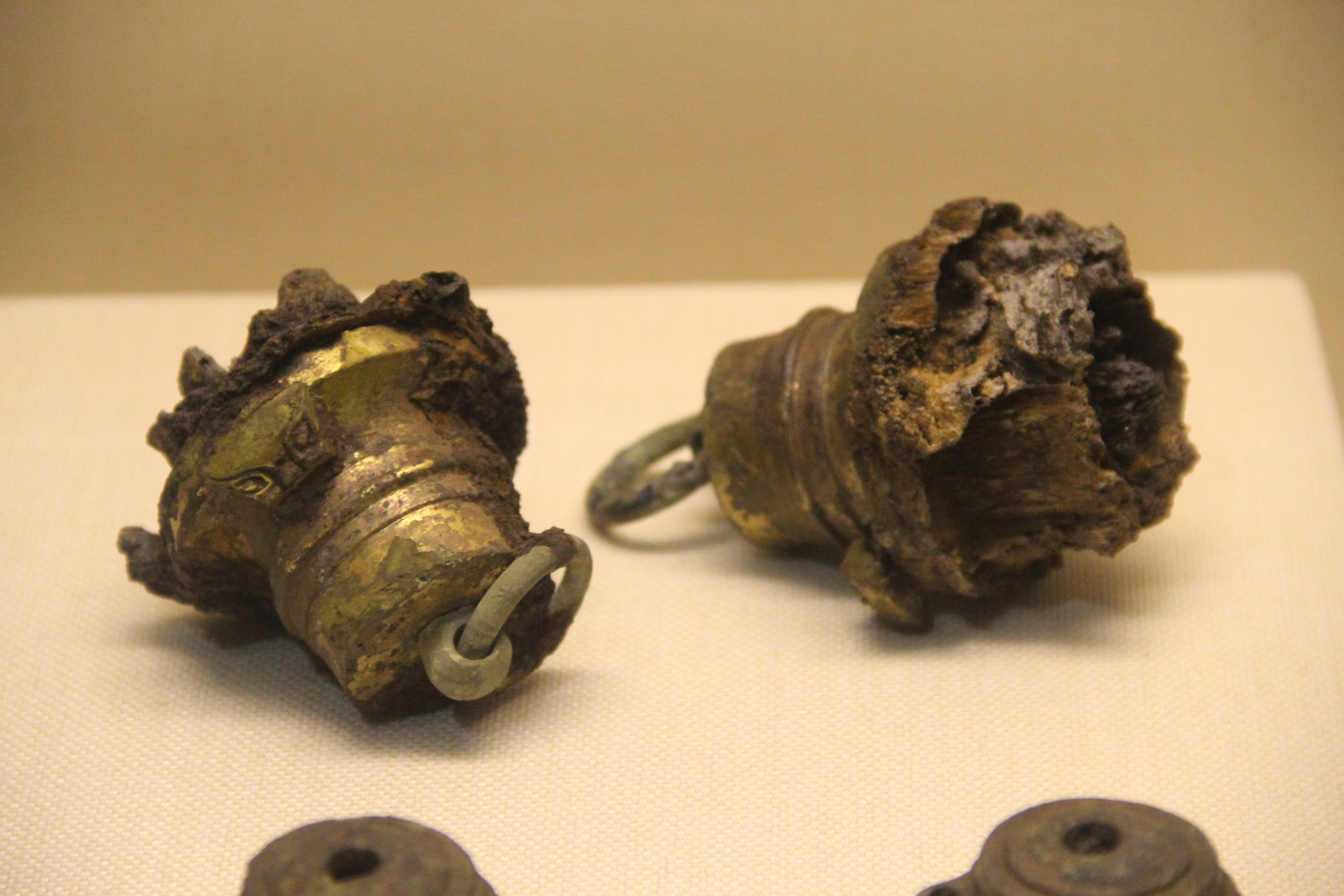
Bronze Chariot Ornaments

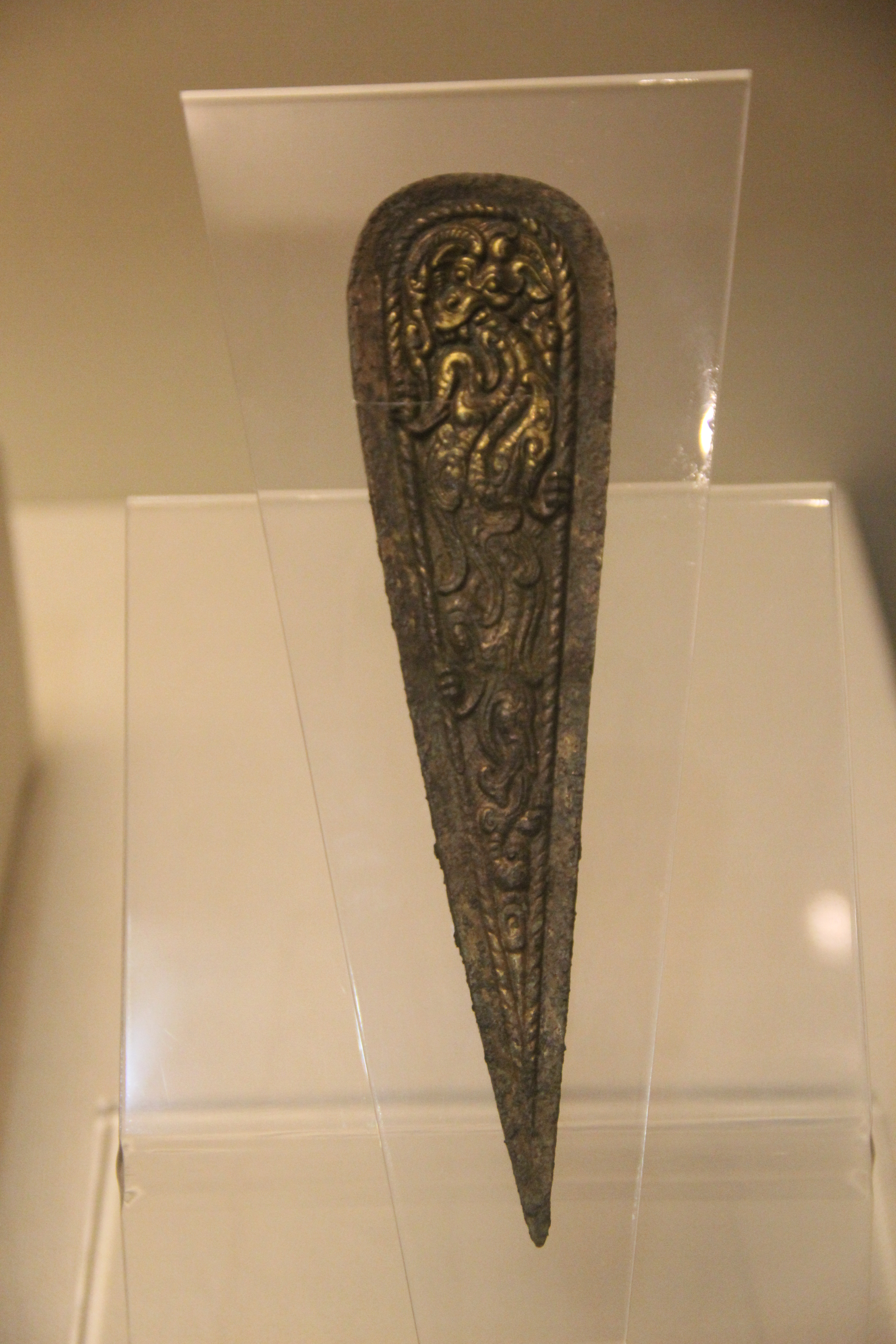
Bronze Horse Ornaments

==== Instruments of Production ====
Before the Qin Dynasty, few iron tools were used in Lingnan region. The unification brought the advanced instruments and mode of productions to Lingnan. More than 120 pieces of iron wares unearthed from the tomb are iron tools, including various types, such as agriculture, fishery and handicraft.

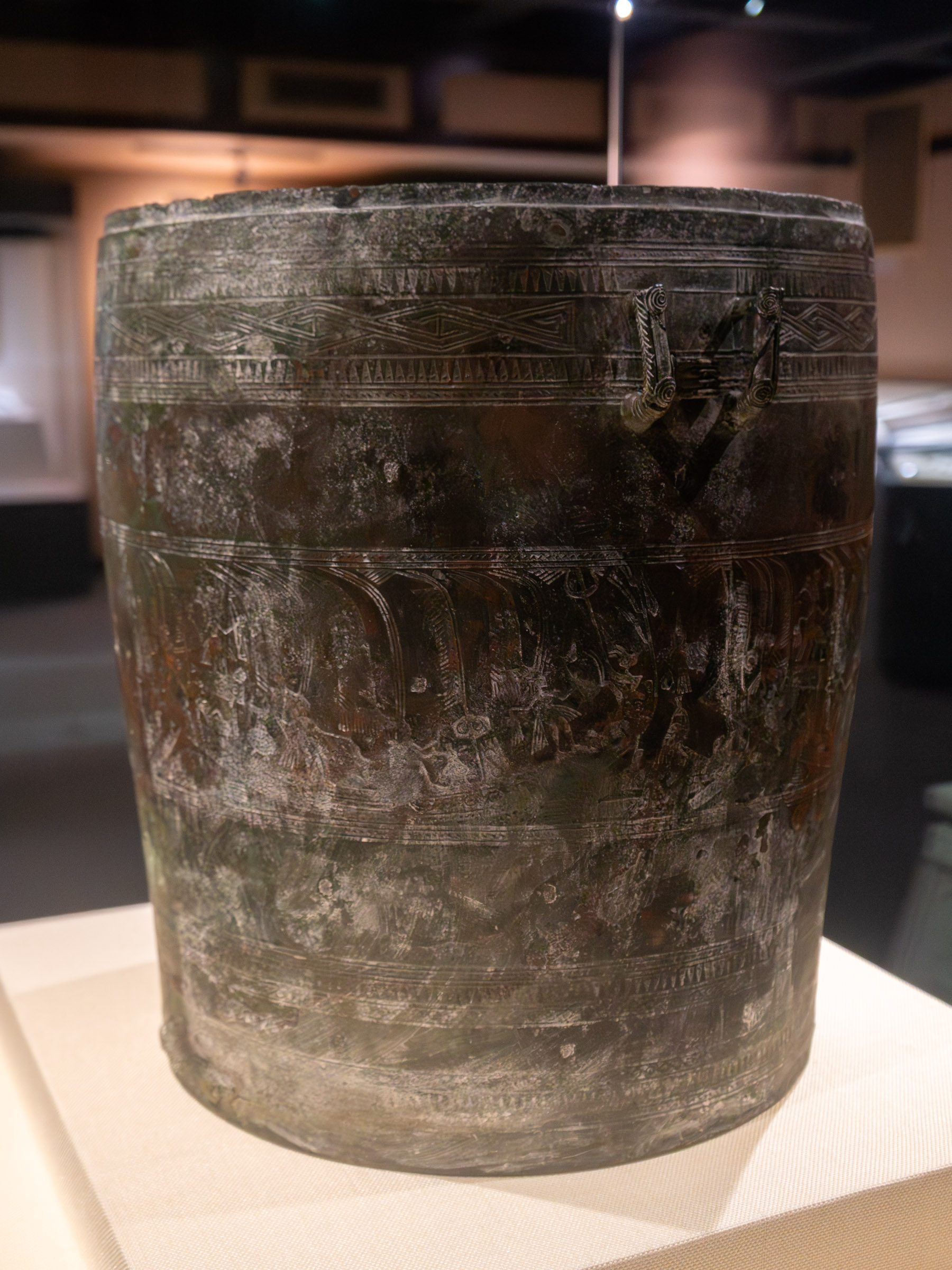
Bronze Bucket with Boating Paintings

- Bronze Bucket with Boating Paintings: The bronze bucket stands as an iconic artifact of Nanyue culture. Of over twenty similar bronze buckets discovered across China, nine were unearthed from the Tomb of Nanyue King. Among these, one features exceptional ornamentation: its midsection displays four warships carved in relief, arranged in procession with raised prows and sterns. Each gracefully curved vessel carries five feathered figures (possibly shamanic warriors) in dynamic poses and one captive. This bronze bucket preserves the most extensive and detailed naval battle scene in ancient Chinese archaeology. The meticulously rendered motifs—including watertight compartments, distinct ship rigging, and warriors armed with spears and shields—provide invaluable references for studying China's 2nd-century BCE maritime technology and naval warfare tactics.
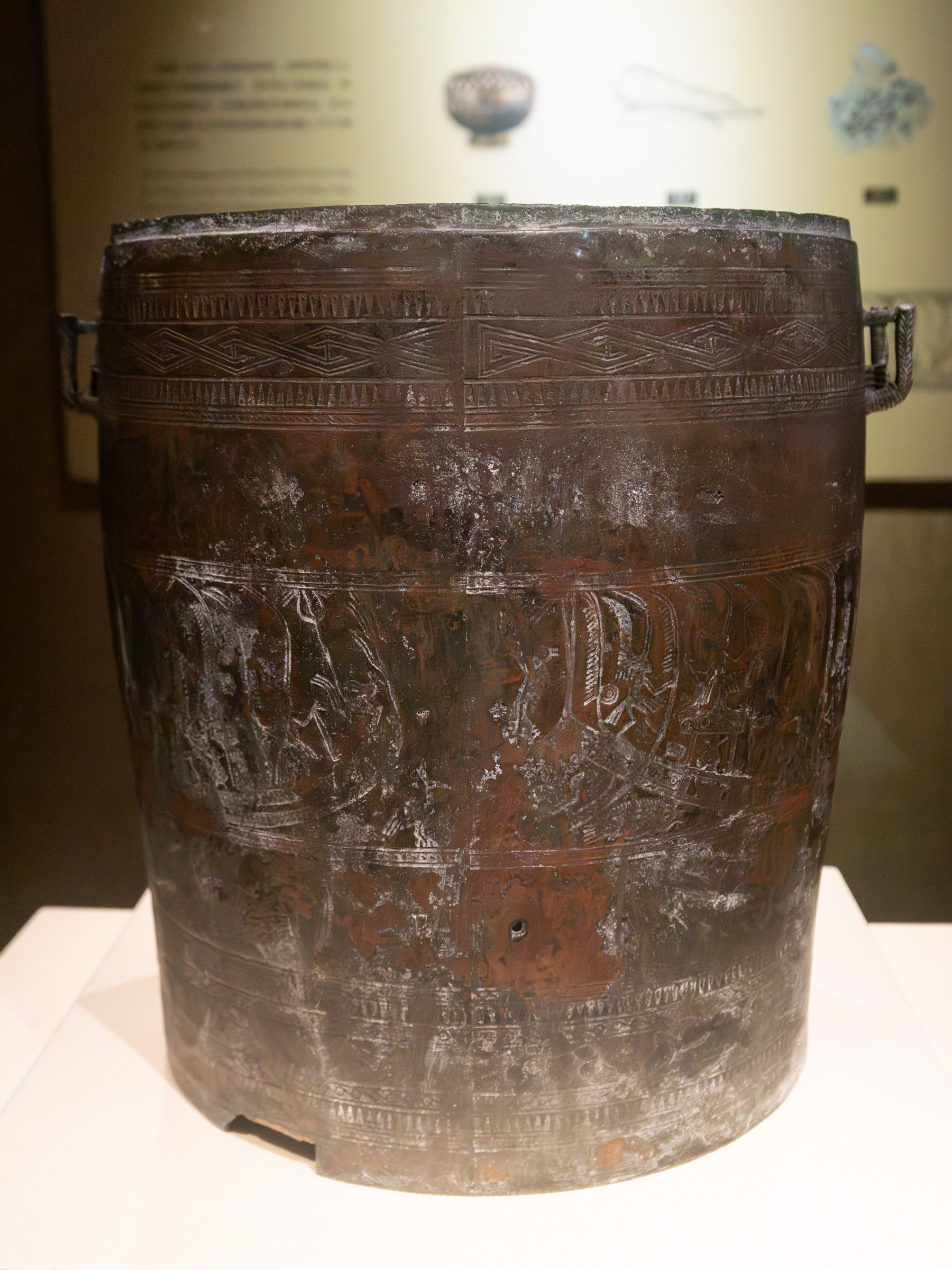
Bronze Bucket with Boating Paintings

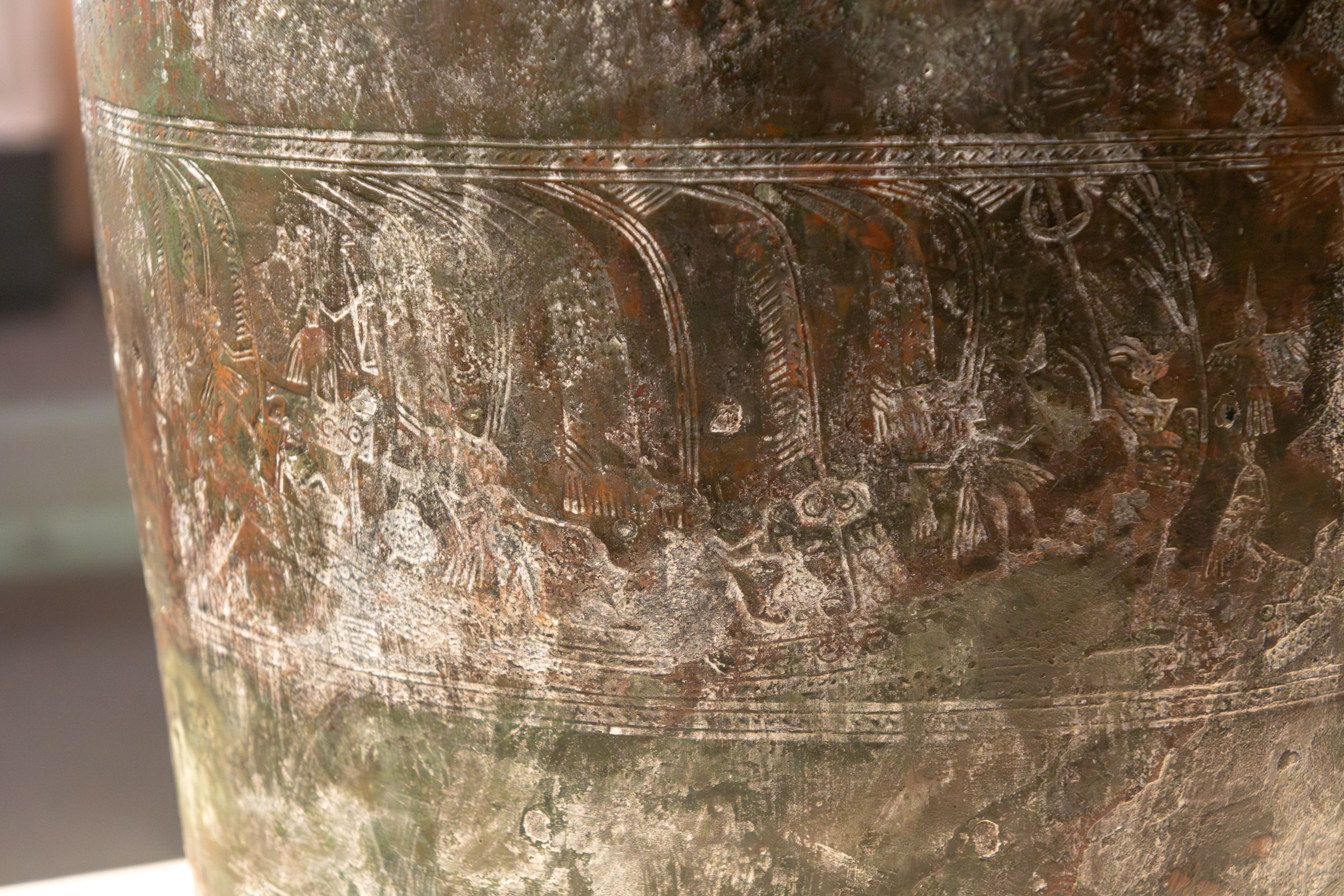
Vessel painting on the bucket

==== Daily Utensils ====
The Tomb of Nanyue King yielded a rich assemblage of daily-use artifacts, primarily bronze and pottery vessels, alongside extensive lacquerware and wooden objects. While the organic materials suffered severe decay—leaving only faint traces—the preserved items collectively showcase Western Han craftsmanship.

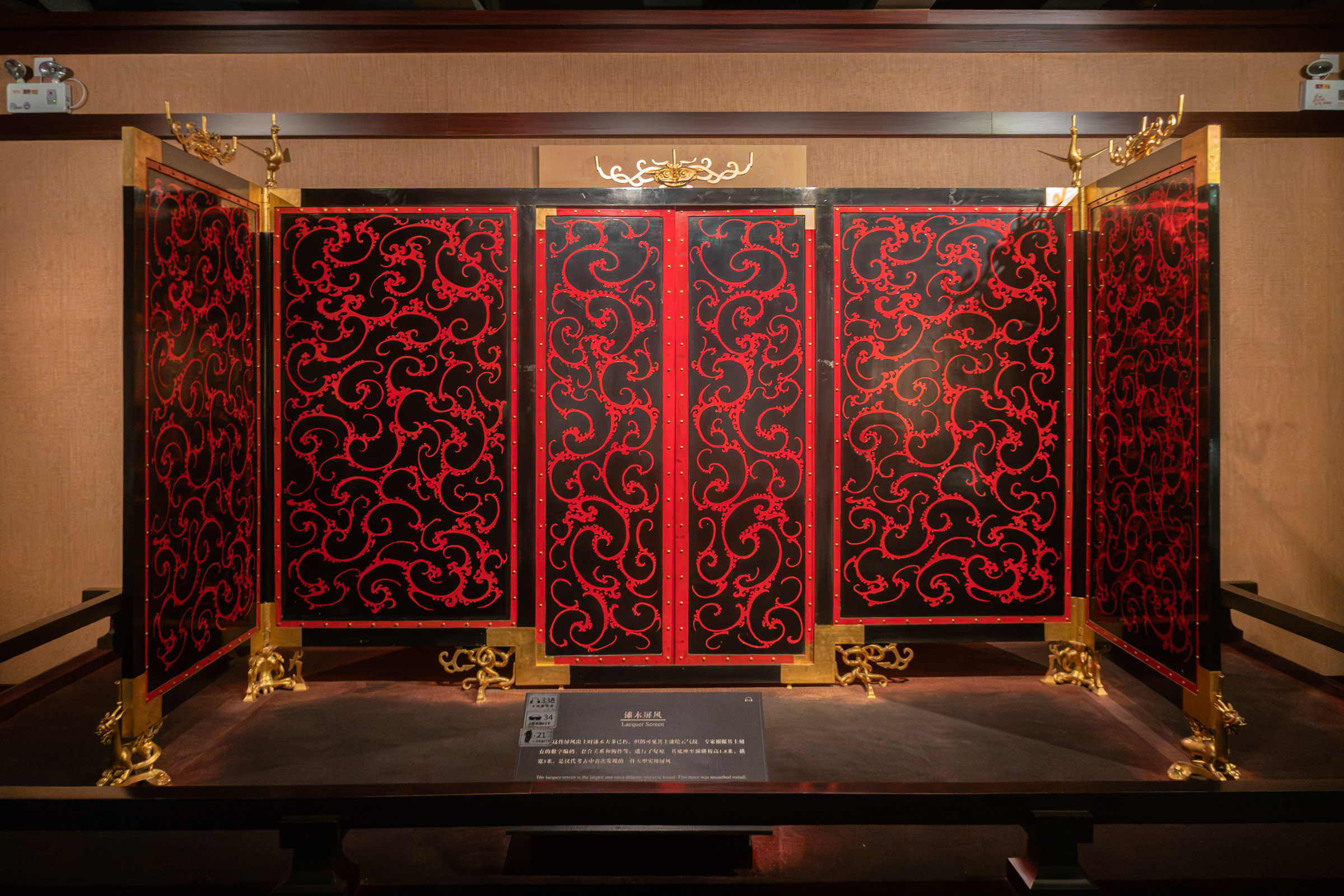
Reconstructed model of the Lacquered Wooden Screen

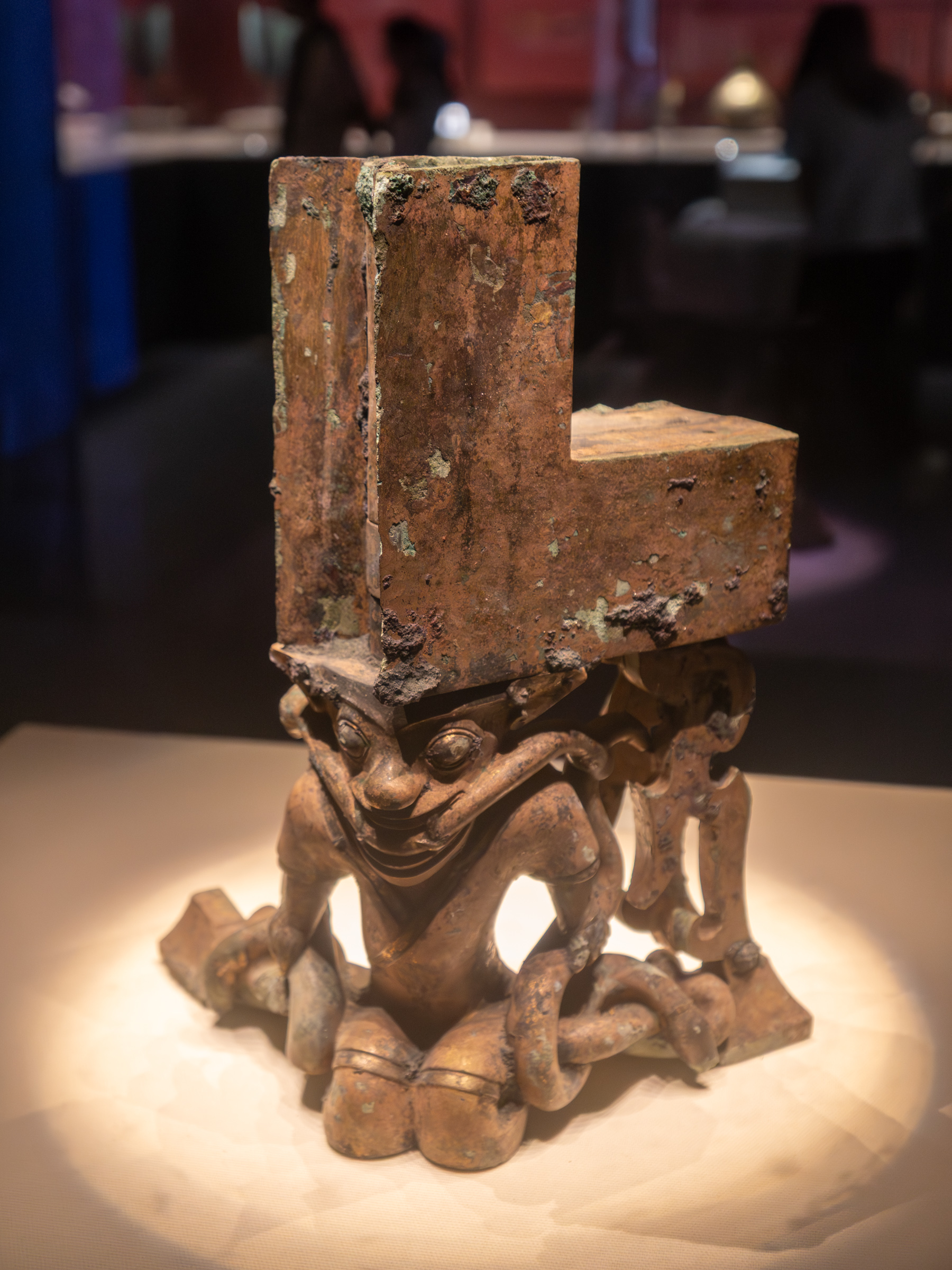
Bronze Snake-tamer Base of the Screen

- Lacquered Wooden Screen: The lacquered wooden screen excavated beside the eastern wall of the main coffin chamber had largely decayed, leaving only fragmented lacquer remnants, yet its gilded bronze components survived intact. Archaeologists determined the screen's original dimensions—3 meters wide and 1.8 meters high (excluding decorative finials)—through the positioning of these bronze components and created a scientific replica. Structurally, the screen featured a three-bay frontal division with two central doors that opened backward, flanked by foldable wing panels extending 90 degrees at either side. Its most extraordinary aspect lay in the gilded bronze parts: five finials crowned the structure—two depicting the mythical Vermilion Bird (朱雀) and three featuring double-faced beast heads. Each finial contained a tubular socket preserving traces of feathers, indicating they originally held pheasant plumes. Below, six symmetrically arranged bases anchored the screen: serpent-entwined bases beneath the doors showed three coiled snakes; corner "snake-tamer" bases depicted a human figure mastering five serpents; and panlong bases integrated one panlong, two snakes, and three frogs into a single dynamic composition. While a smaller painted screen was previously discovered at Mawangdui Han tomb in Changsha, its crude craftsmanship identified it as a miniature model used as grave goods. In contrast, this Nanyue screen represents China's earliest surviving functional Western Han screen. Its monumental scale, sophisticated collapsible design, and mythologically rich bronze fittings—showcasing unparalleled craftsmanship—led to its designation in 2002 as one of the first batch of Chinese cultural relics forbidden to be exhibited abroad.
- Painted Bronze Mirrors: The tomb yielded four painted bronze mirrors, including a landmark specimen measuring 41 cm in diameter—the largest Western Han painted mirror discovered in China. Its surface depicts an intricate scene of four noblewomen observing a sword duel.
- Composite Mirror with Bronze Stand: This innovative artifact consists of two separately cast components: a high-tin-content mirror disc (optimized for reflectivity but brittle) and a high-lead mirror stand (ductile for structural support). Only three such composite mirrors exist in China, representing a sophisticated metallurgical solution to balance functionality and durability. Their hybrid construction marks a pinnacle of ancient mirror craftsmanship.
- Blue Flat Glass Plaques: Twenty-two rectangular plaques (11 pairs) challenged previous assumptions about Chinese glassmaking. Each features translucent pale blue flat glass set within gilded bronze frames. Scientific analysis confirmed these as domestically produced lead-barium glass—the earliest known Chinese flat glass (2nd century BCE). Their uniform thickness, minimal bubbles, and crystalline clarity demonstrate advanced glass technology, redefining the timeline of China's glass industry and confirming sophisticated production capabilities during the Western Han.
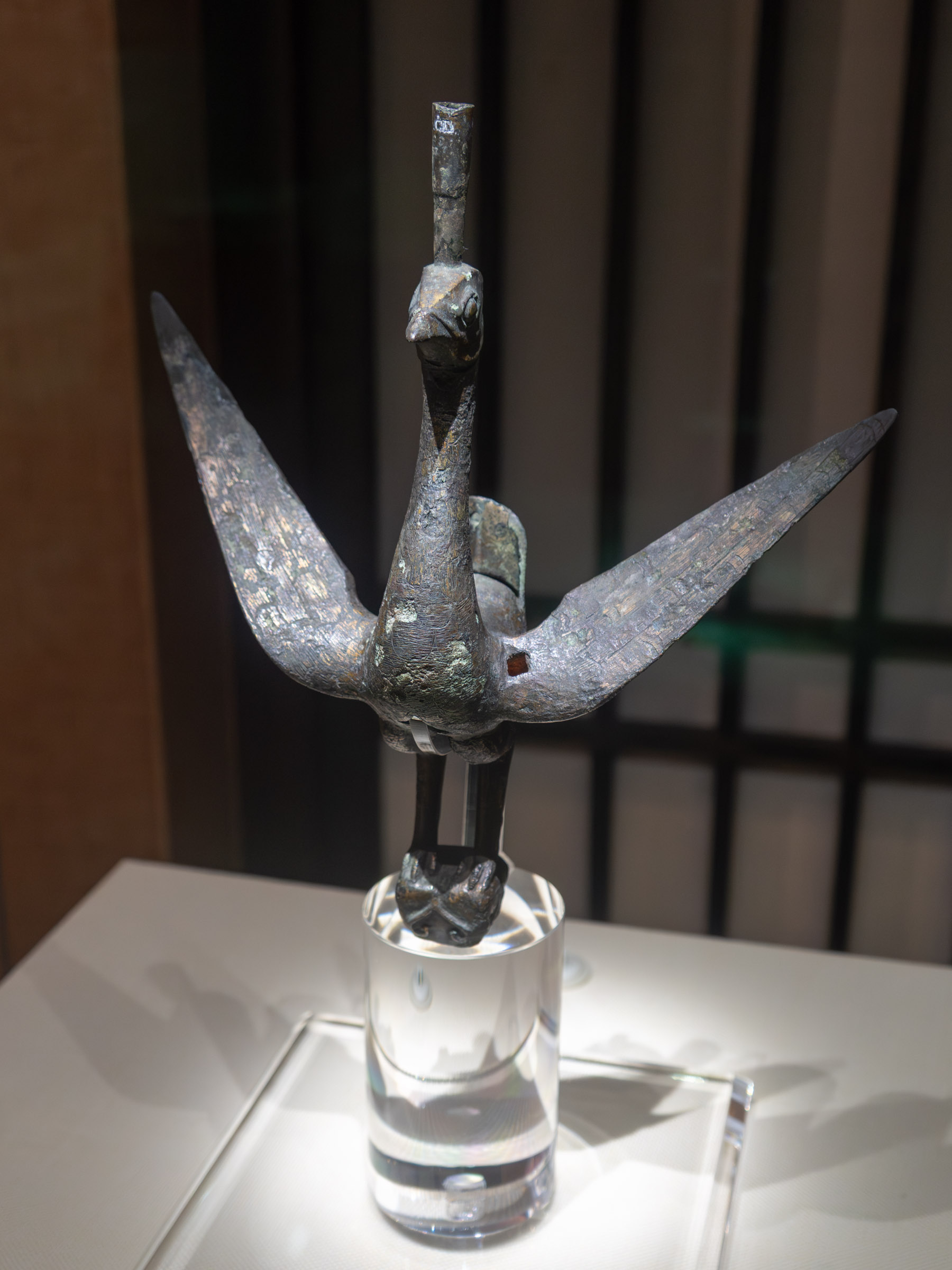
Bronze Vermilion Bird Finial of the Screen

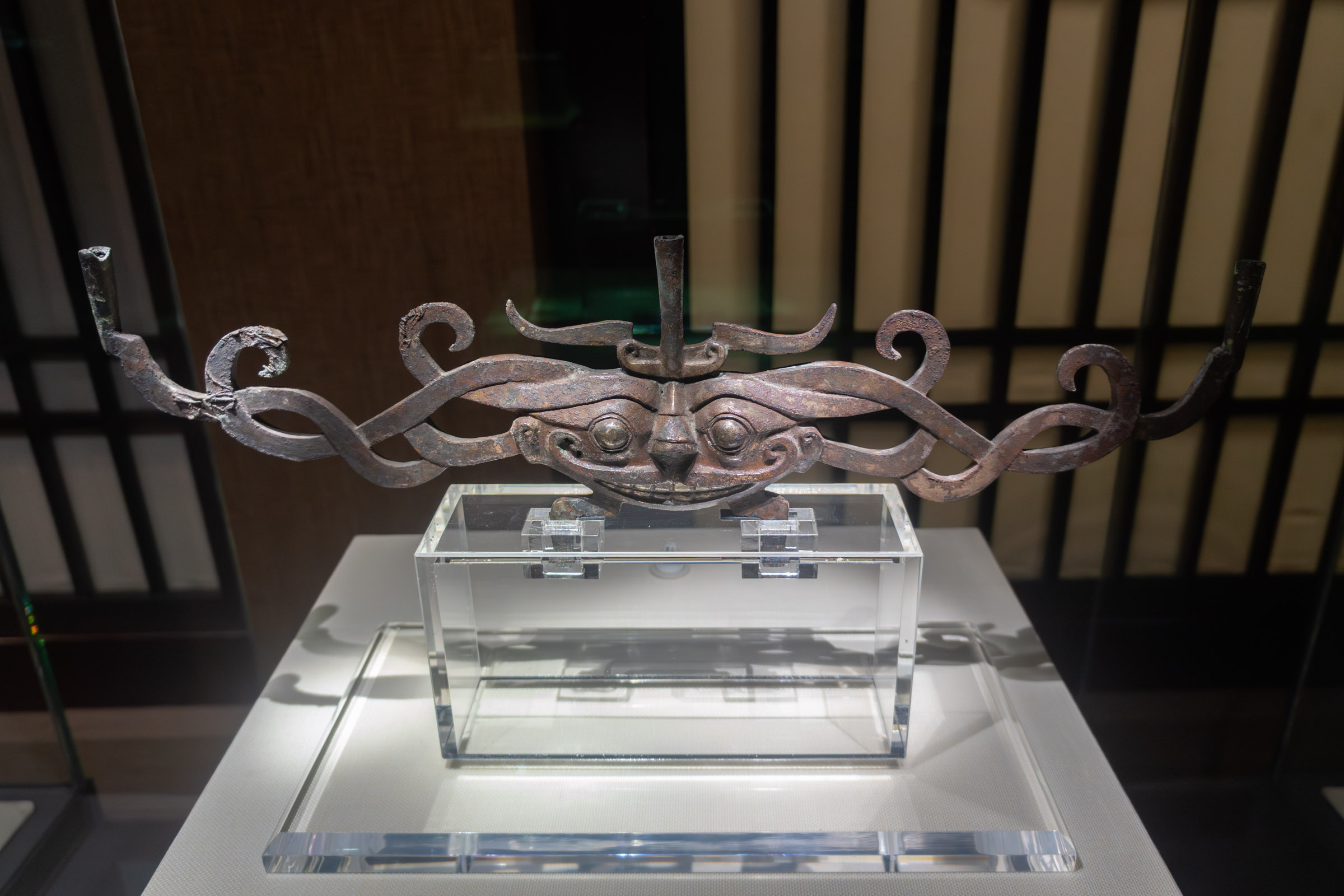
Bronze Double-faced Beast Head Finial of the Screen

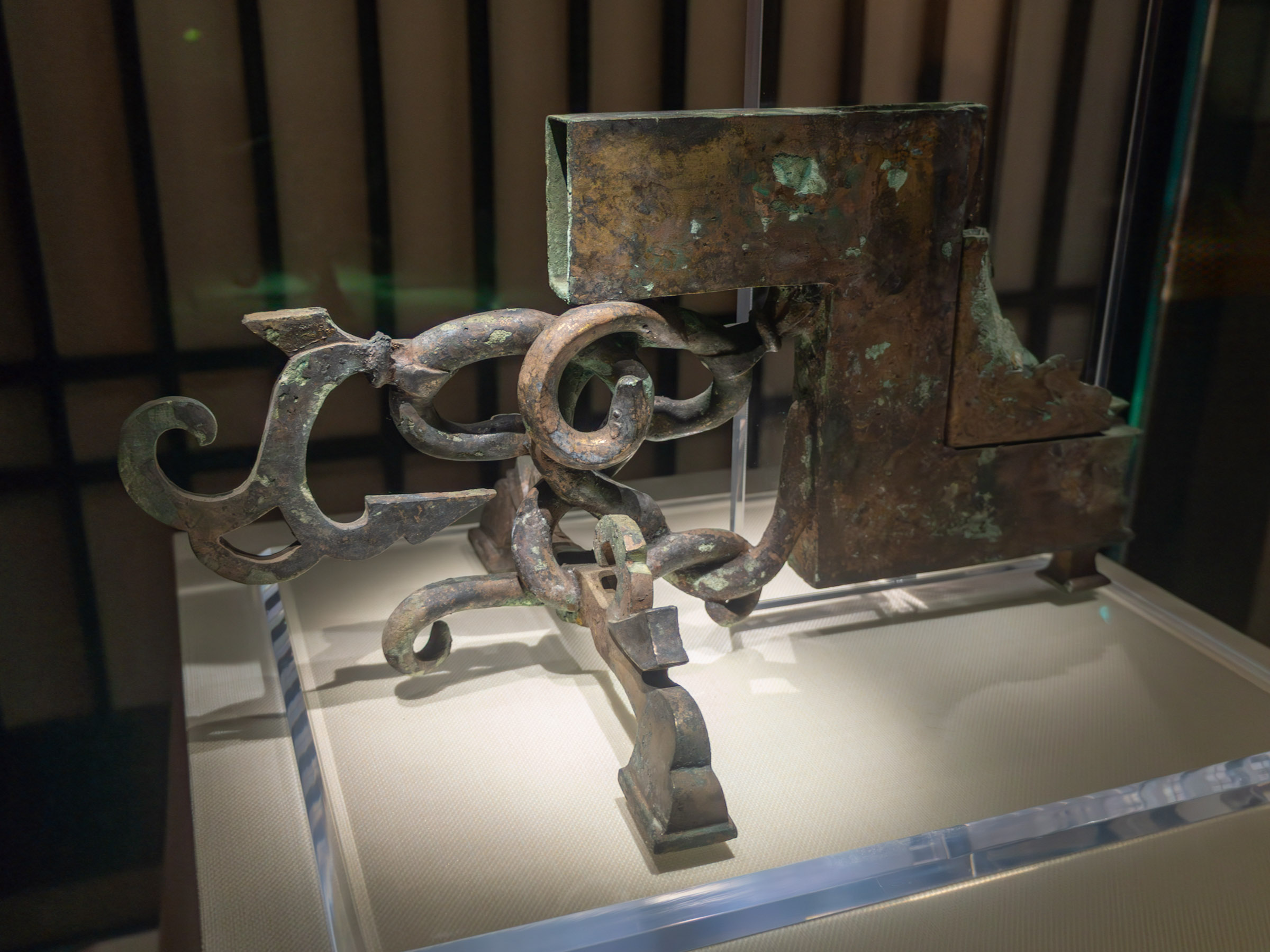
Bronze Entwined Serpents Base of the Screen

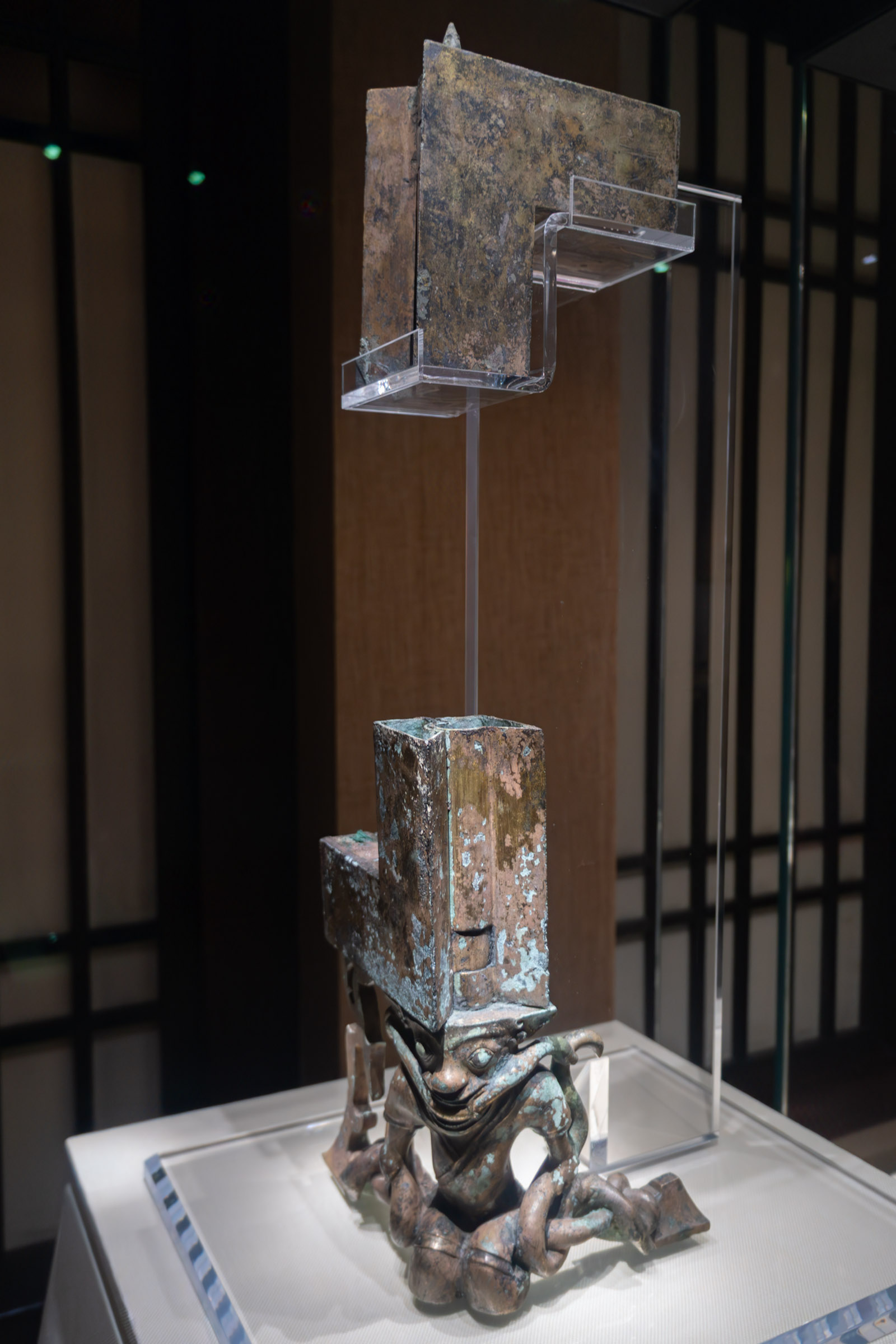
Bronze Snake-tamer Base of the Screen

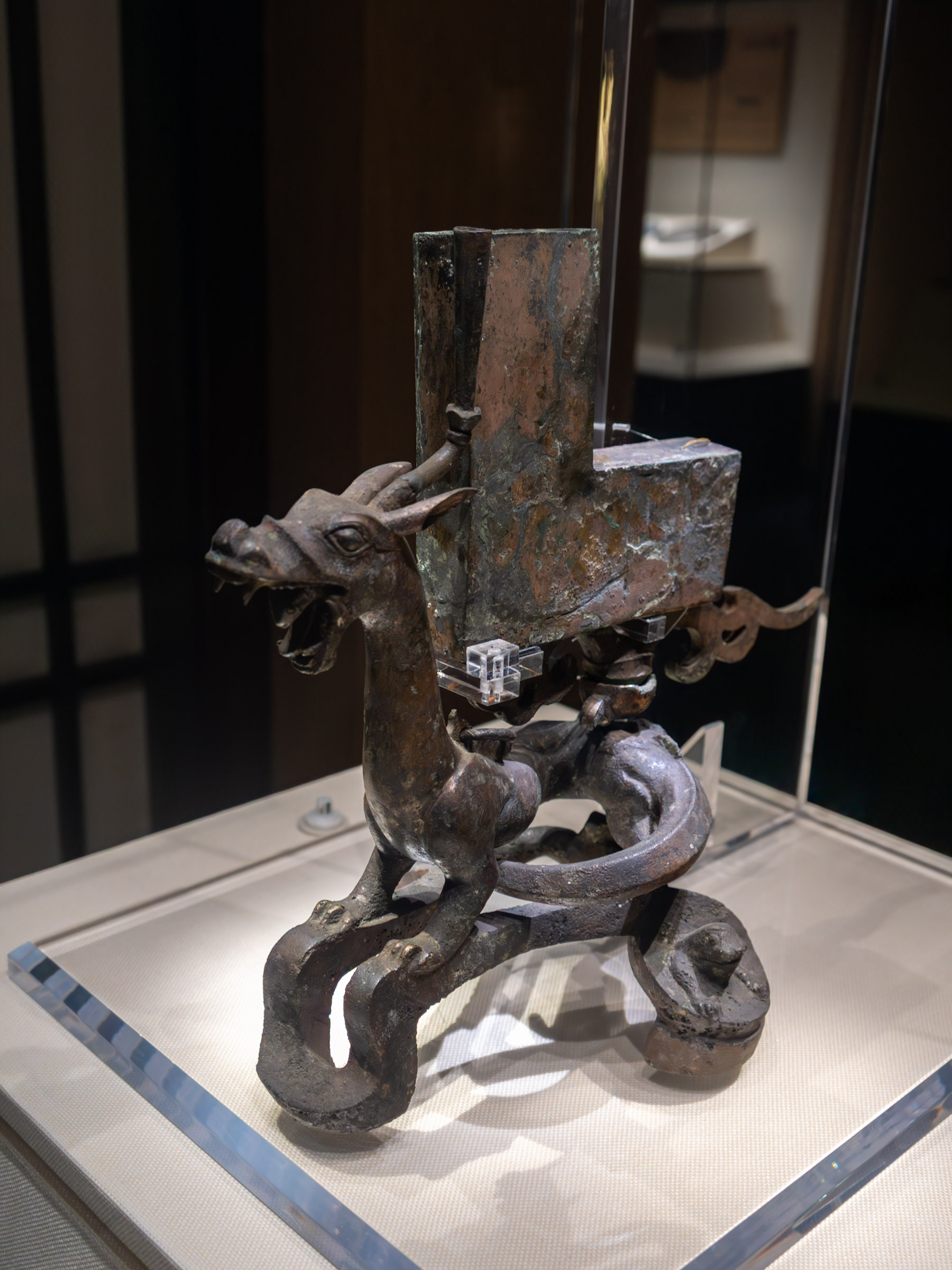
Bronze Panlong Base of the Screen

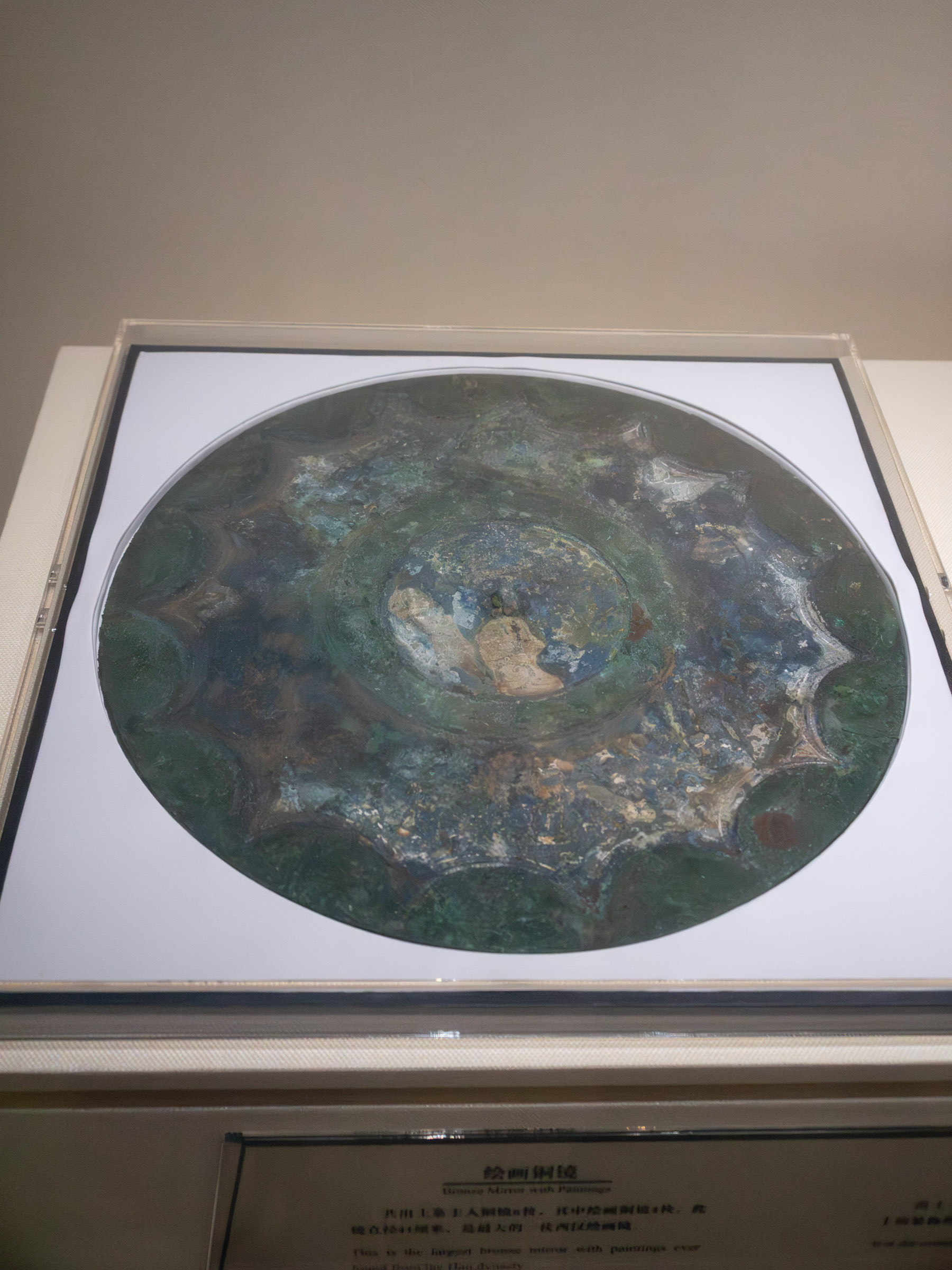
Painted Bronze Mirrors

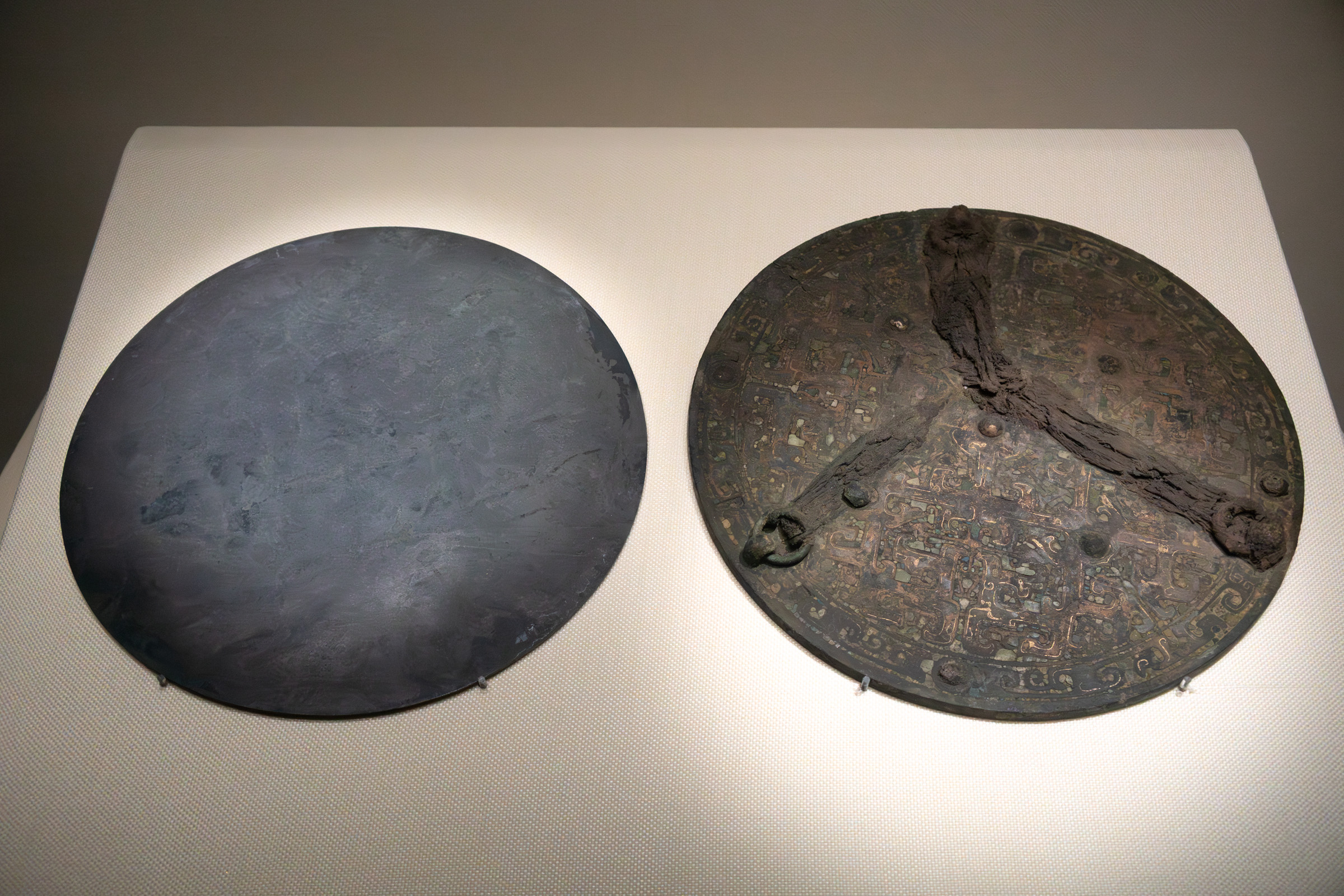
Composite Mirror with Bronze Stand

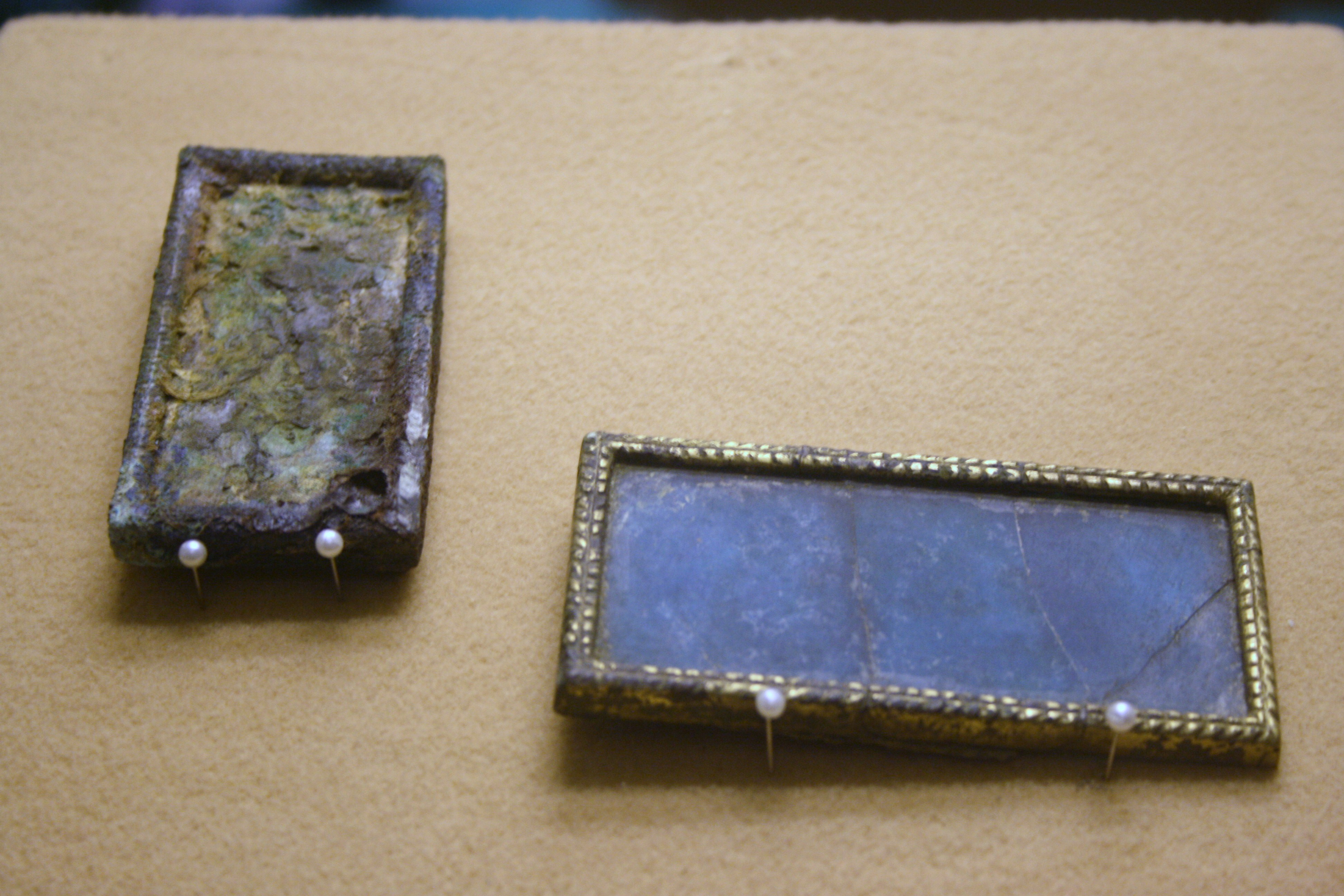
Blue Flat Glass Plaques

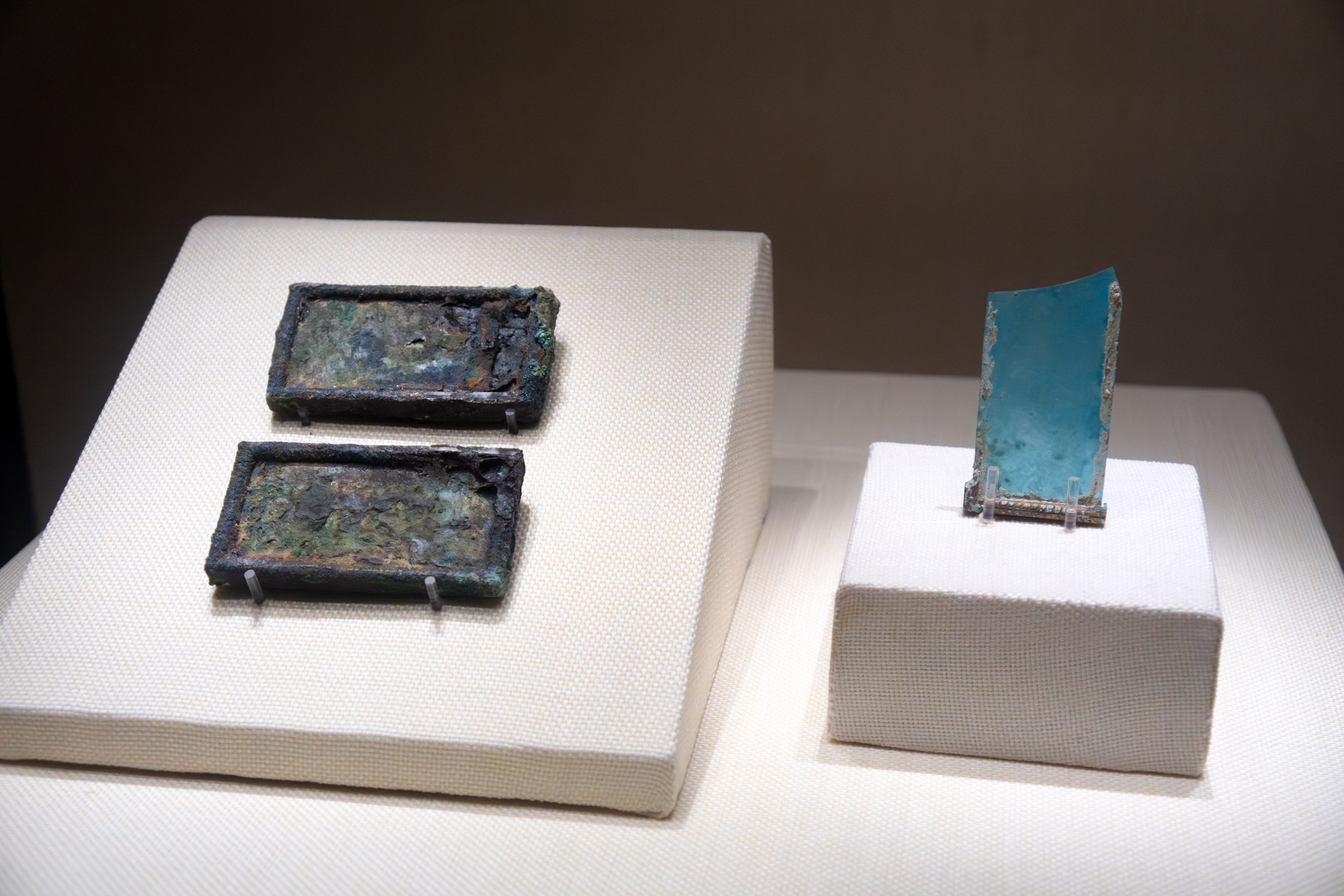
Blue Flat Glass Plaques

==== Musical Instruments and Banquet Utensils ====
The Tomb of Nanyue King yielded extensive artifacts for culinary, dining, storage, and ablution purposes, exhibiting distinct cultural features from Qin, Han, Yue, Chu, and Shu traditions. Additionally, the tomb contained five complete sets of large-scale ritual musical instruments.

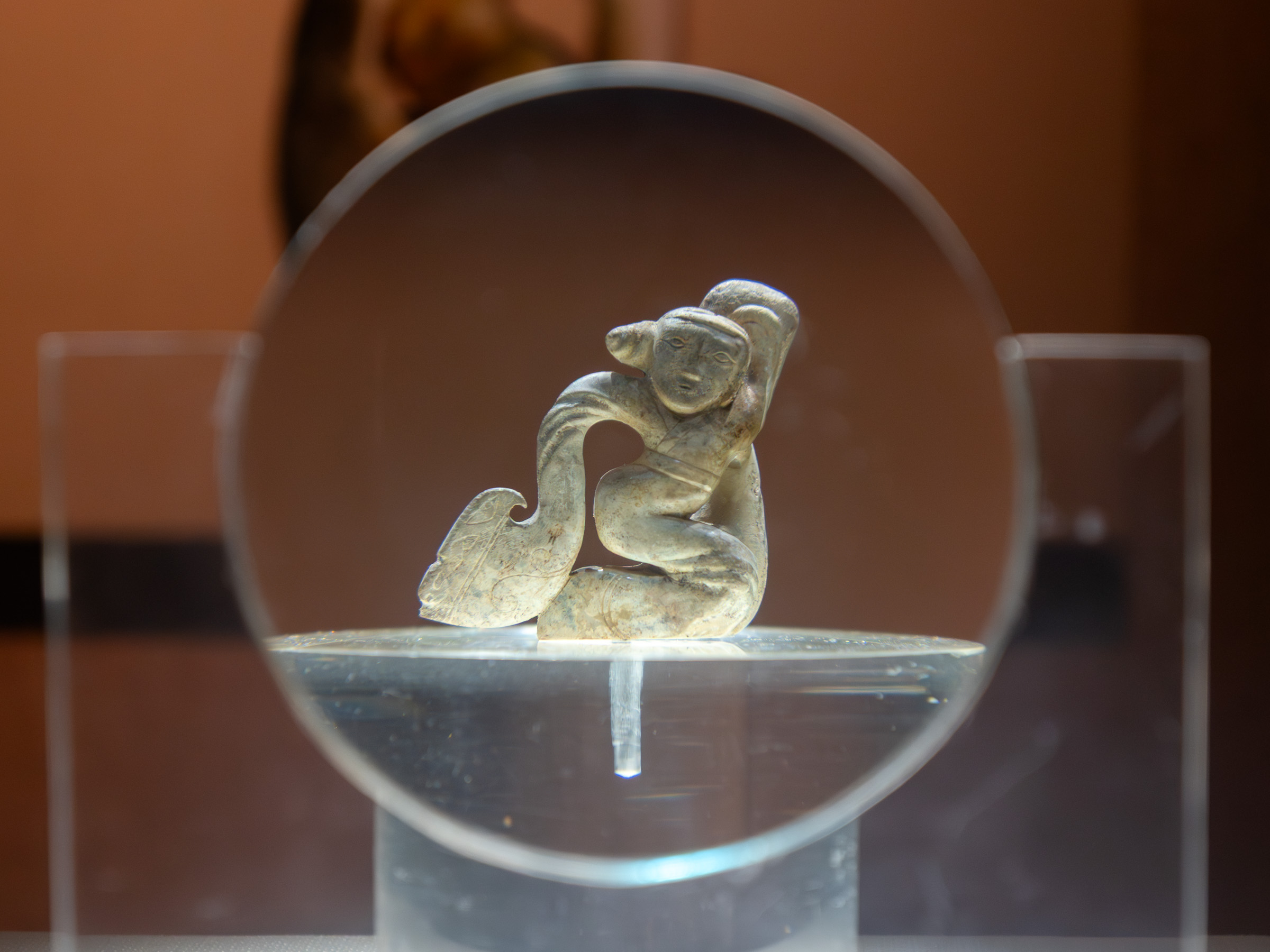
Jade Dancing Figure

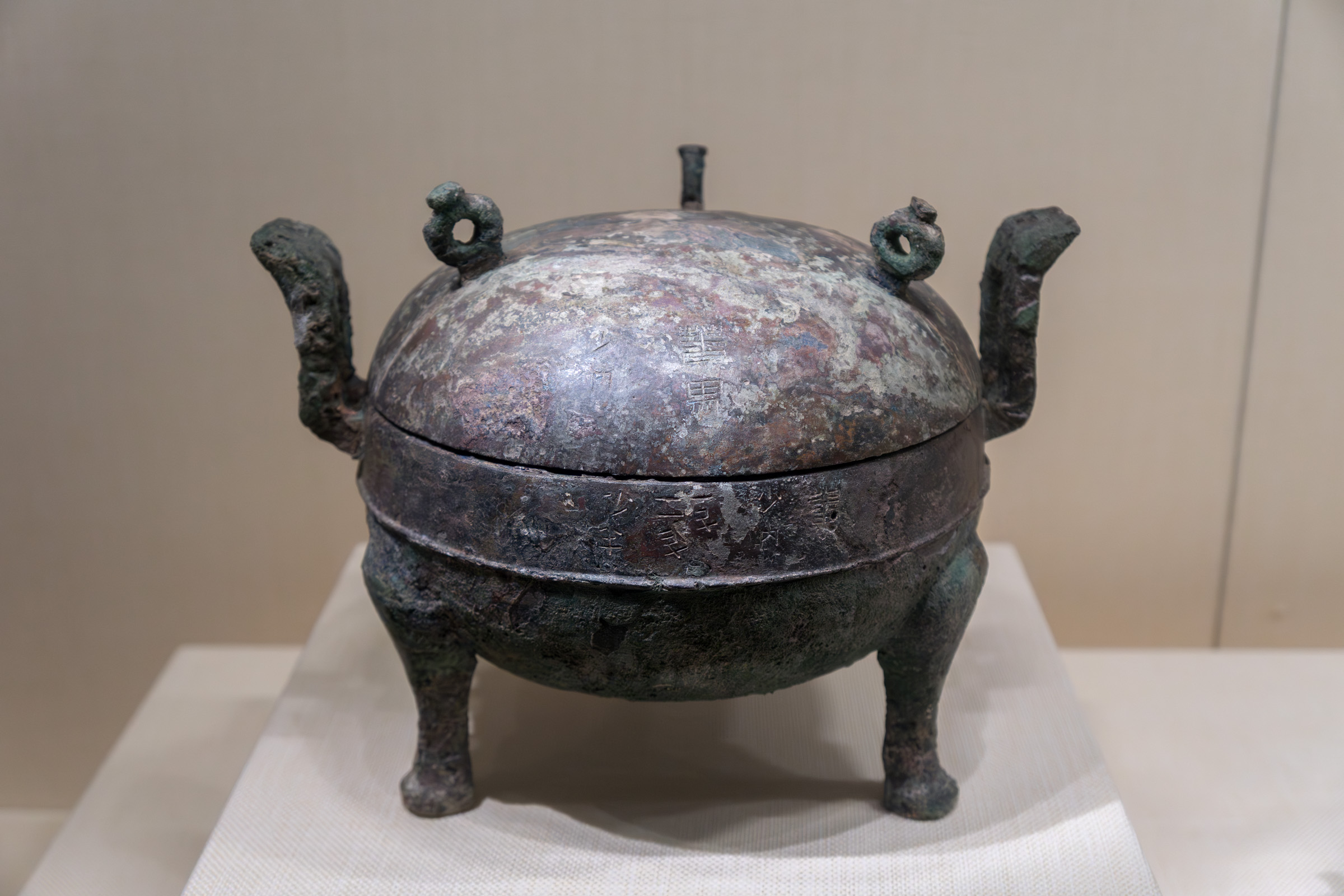
Bronze Dǐng with "蕃禺" inscription

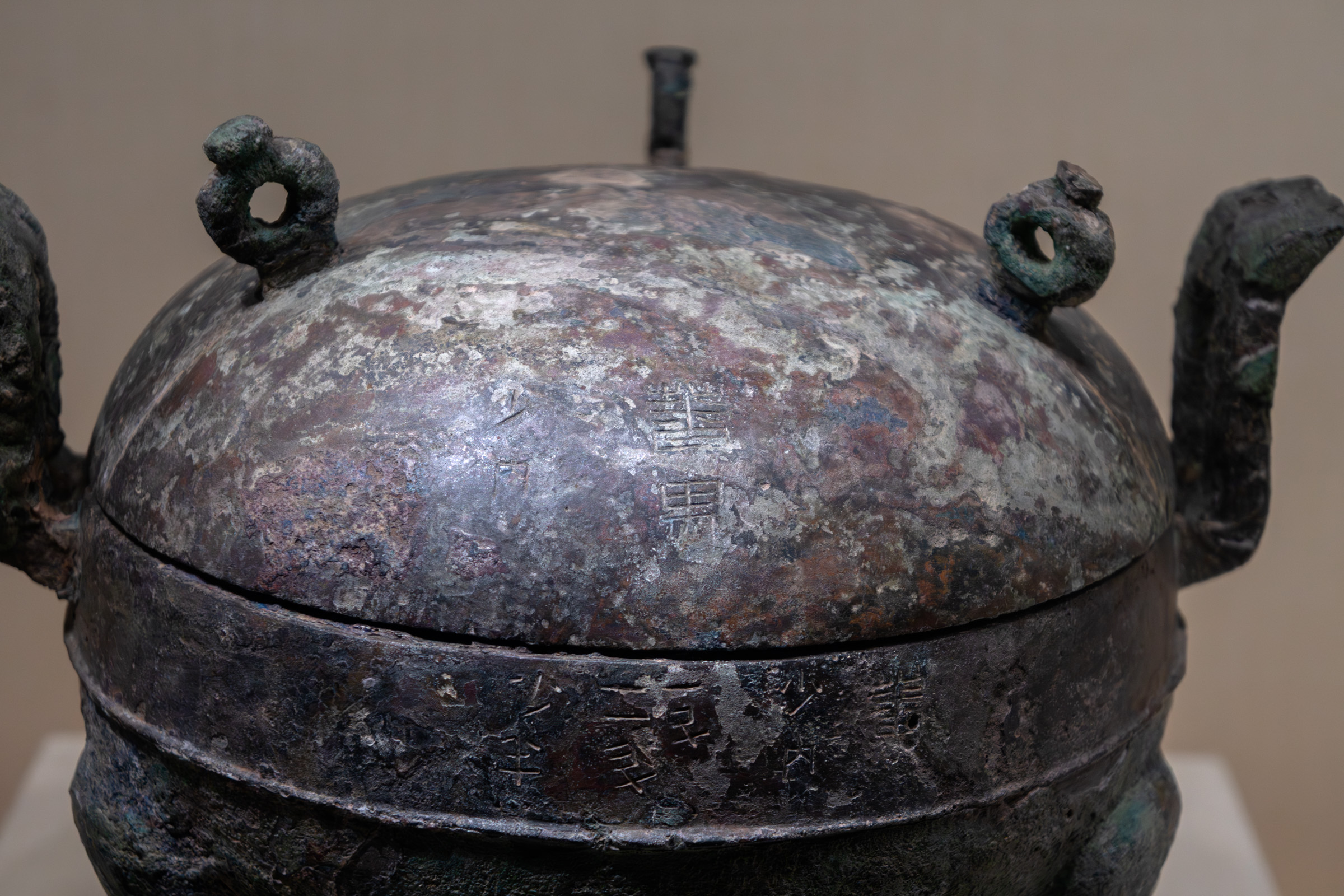
"蕃禺" inscription on Bronze Dǐng

- Jade Dancing Figure: This jade figure, standing merely 3.5 cm tall, captures a woman in Han attire mid-dance with vividly carved flowing sleeves. While jade dancer pendants are not uncommon in Han tombs, this artifact is the only known example rendered in full-round sculpture. The figurine’s suspended motion and intricate drapery folds transcend ritual symbolism, offering a rare glimpse into the performative arts of the Western Han court.
- Bronze Dǐng: The Tomb of Nanyue King yielded 51 dǐng (ritual tripod cauldrons) across bronze, iron, and ceramic materials, with 36 crafted in bronze. These bronze dǐng distinctly reflect three cultural traditions through their forms and decorative features. Han-style dǐng feature short, hoof-shaped legs, and nine bear inscriptions such as "蕃禺" (Fānyú)—the earliest attested name for Guangzhou during the Qin-Han period. These inscribed vessels serve as tangible evidence of the city's ancient urban foundations. Yue-style dǐng, represented by seventeen examples, exhibit characteristic deep bellies, thin lids, lateral handles, and slender, outward-splayed legs. A singular Chu-style dǐng stands apart with elongated hoof-shaped legs terminating in high-relief beaked mythological creatures, all set against a background of swirling cloud patterns.
- Bronze Barbecue Grills: Three bronze grills of varying sizes (square/rectangular) feature upturned corners to prevent food slippage, slightly concave bases for charcoal placement, and ring-pulls on all sides. Some include wheels for mobility, reflecting sophisticated Western Han culinary practices.
- Ant-Proof Bronze Hooks: Used for food storage, these innovative hooks feature a central inverted bell-shaped water tray. Filling it with water created a barrier preventing ants from reaching suspended food—an early example of pest control technology.
- Stone Bianqing: Two sets of bianqing (ancient L-shaped percussion instruments) were excavated: one 8-piece and one 10-piece set. Both exhibit severe surface degradation from millennia of burial.
- Bronze Goudiao: This eight-piece ritual percussion set (total weight: 191 kg) represents the first discovery of Yue-style goudiao in Lingnan. Each bell bears a yin-engraved inscription: "文帝九年乐府工造" (Crafted in the 9th Year of Emperor Wen by the Music Bureau), dating production to 129 BCE—a crucial chronological marker for Nanyue history.
- Bronze Bianzhong: Excavated from the eastern side chamber, this bianzhong set ensemble comprises 14 vertically suspended niuzhong (钮钟) bells and 5 angled yongzhong (甬钟) bells. Acoustic analysis confirms a full seven-note range and dual-tone capability (producing different pitches when struck at different points), demonstrating advanced Han musical acoustics.
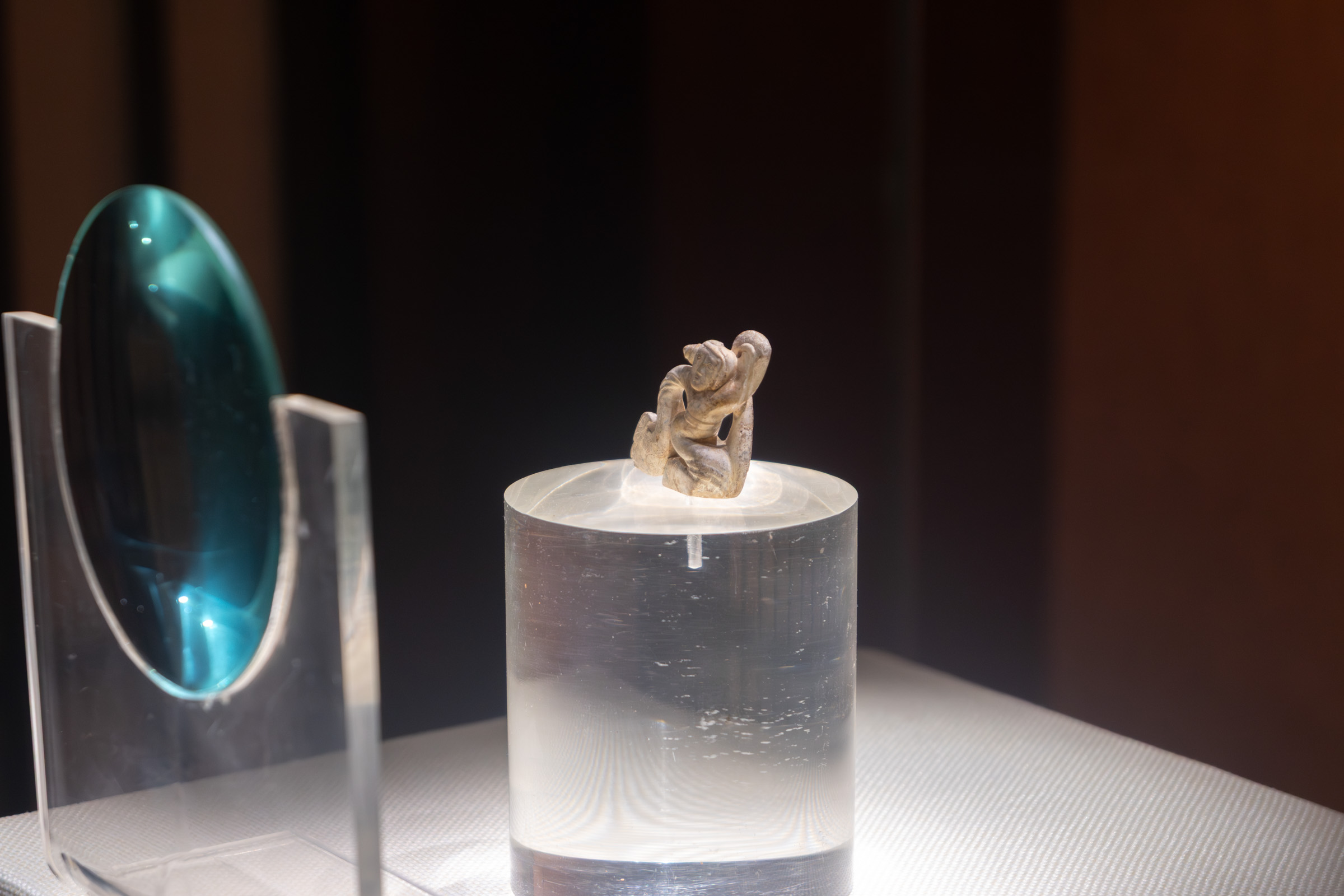
Jade Dancing Figure

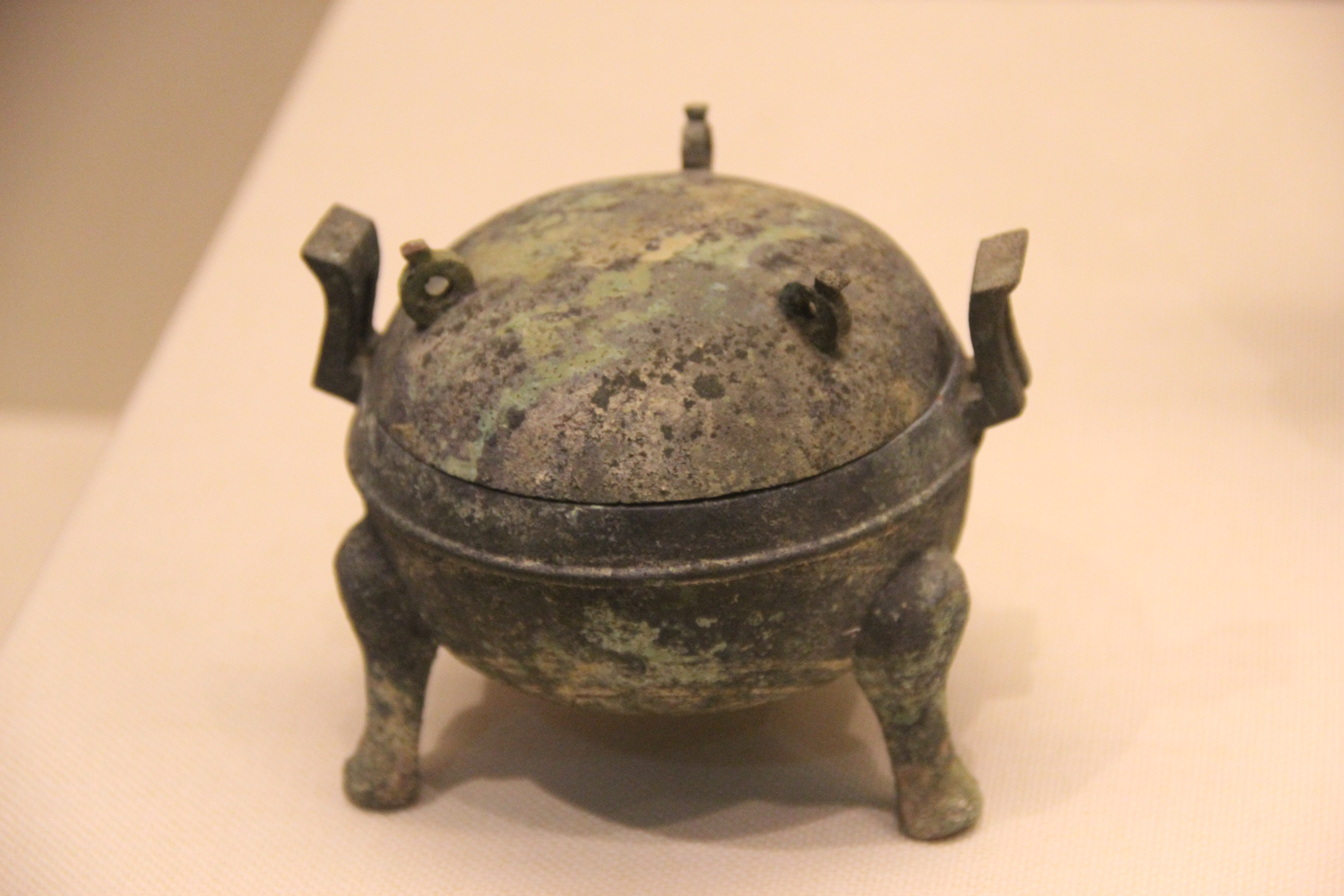
Han-style dǐng

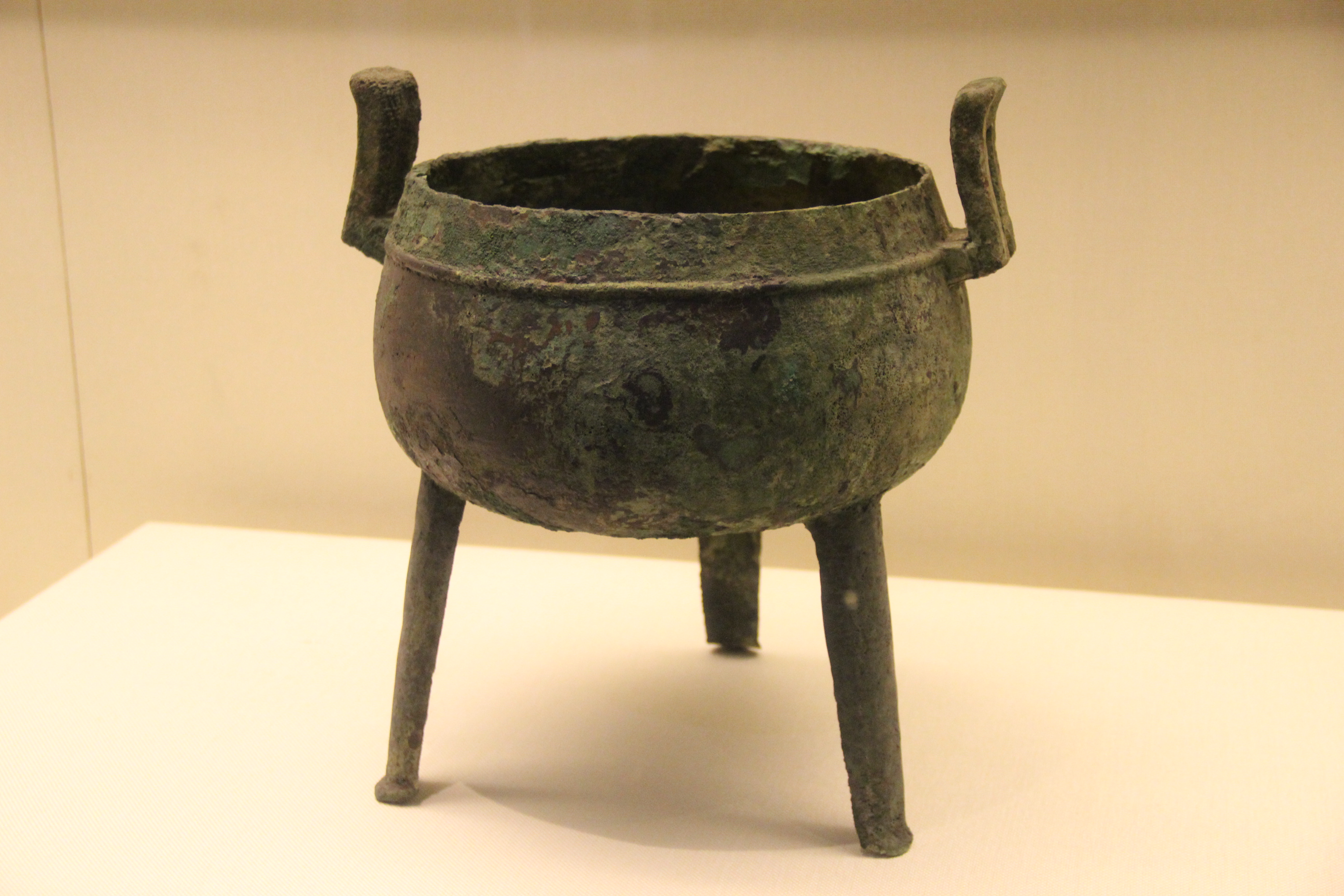
Yue-style dǐng

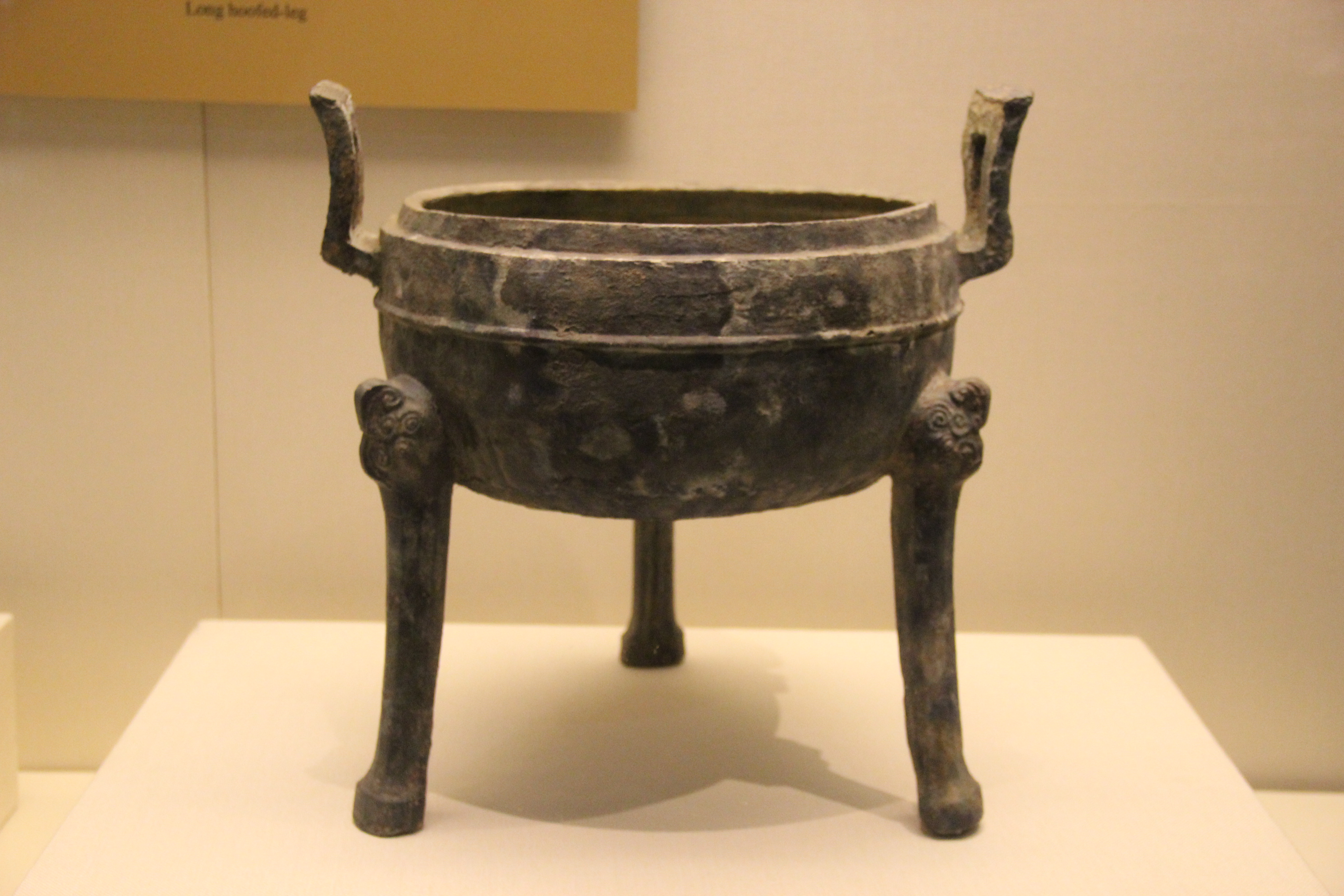
Chu-style dǐng

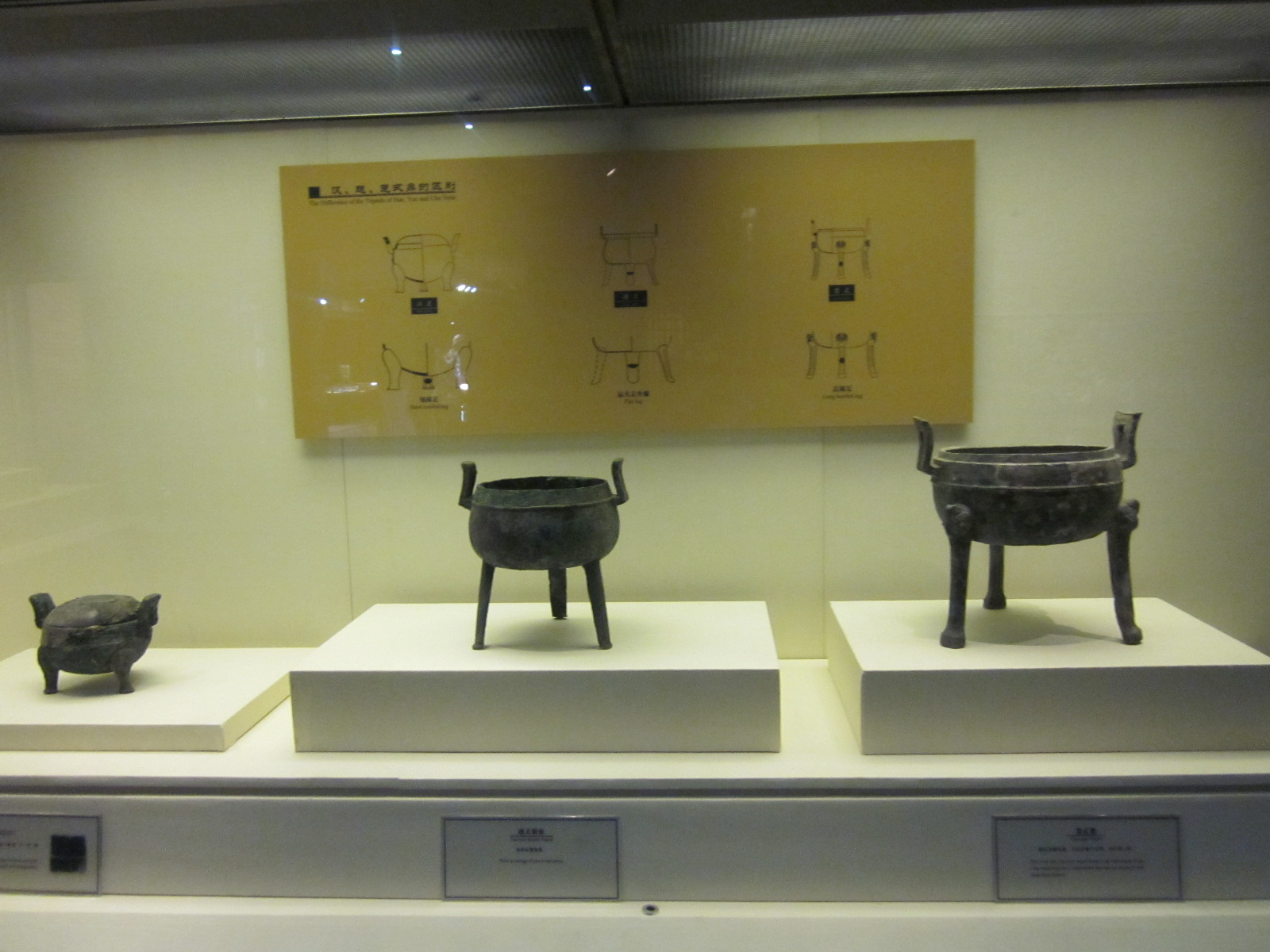
Comparison of Han, Yue and Chu-style dǐng

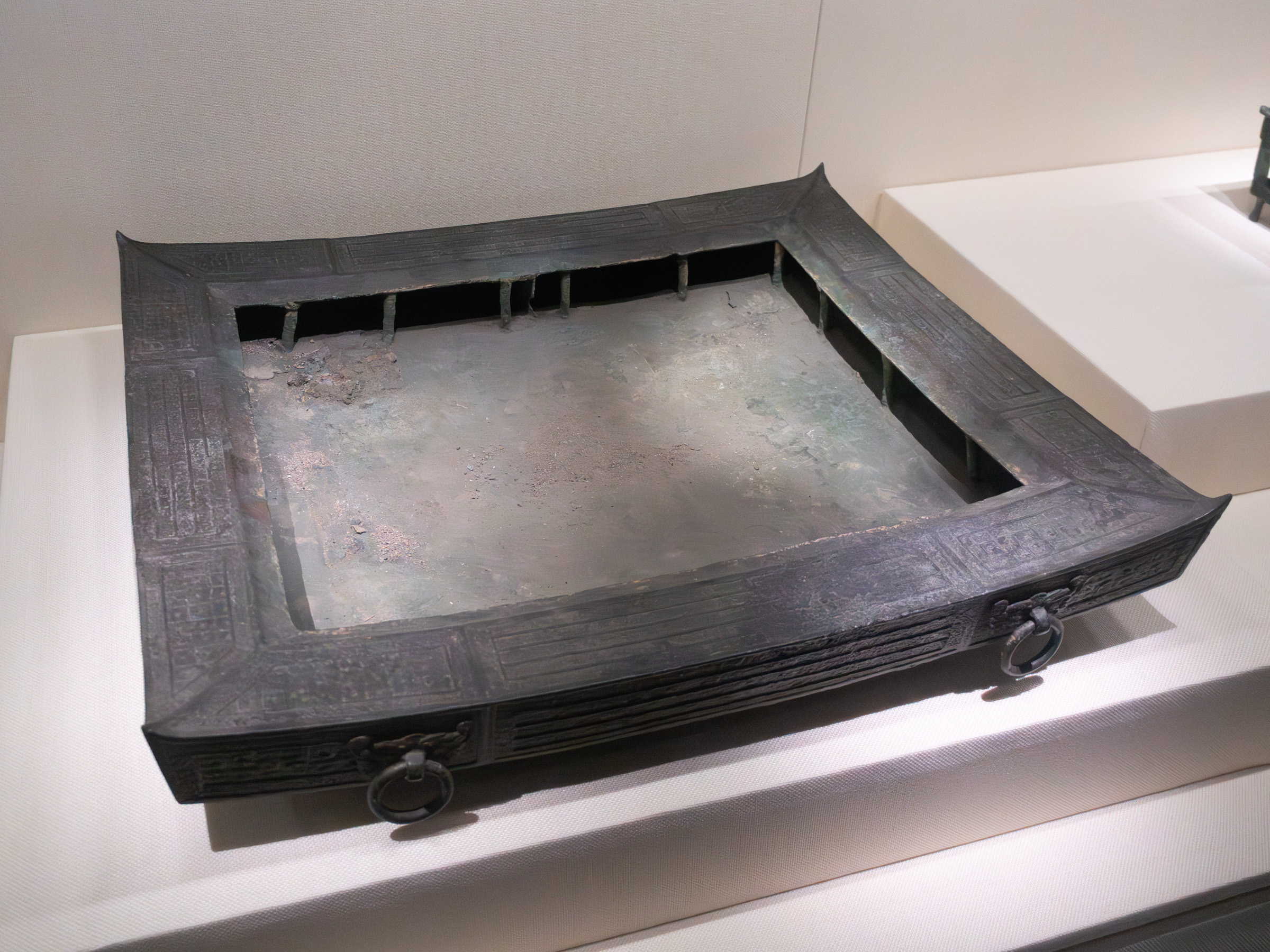
Bronze Barbecue Grills

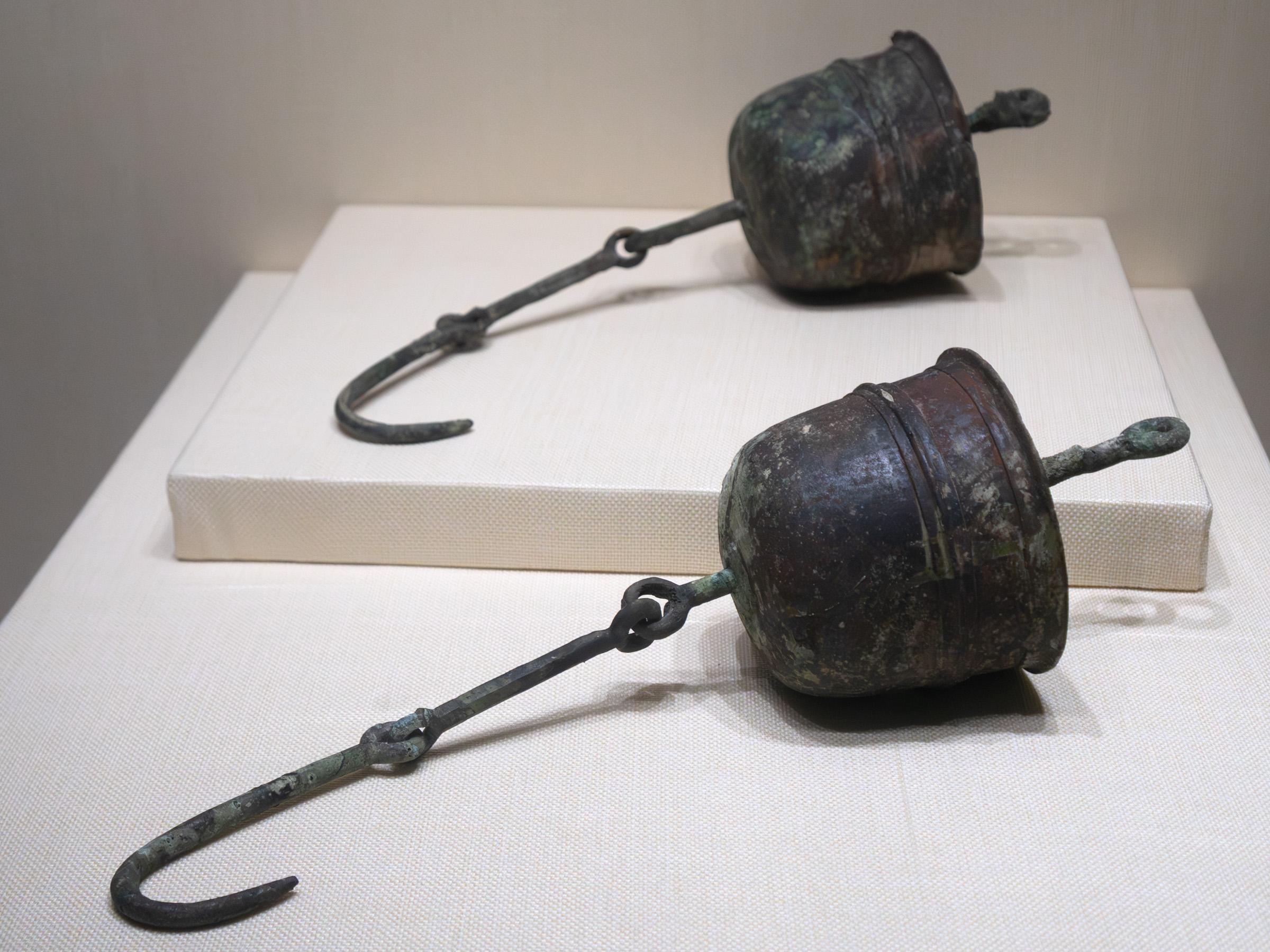
Bronze Hooks

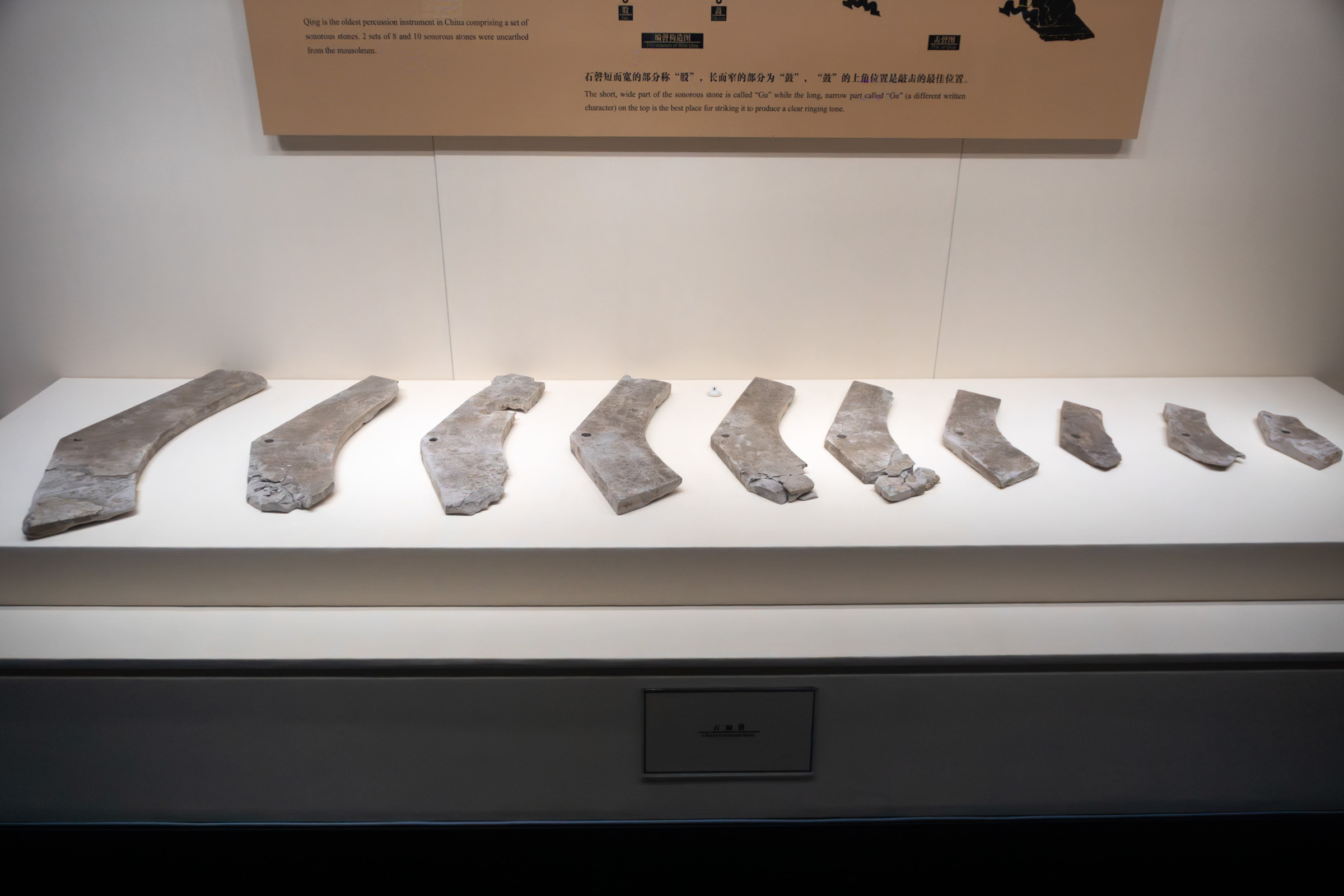
Bianqing

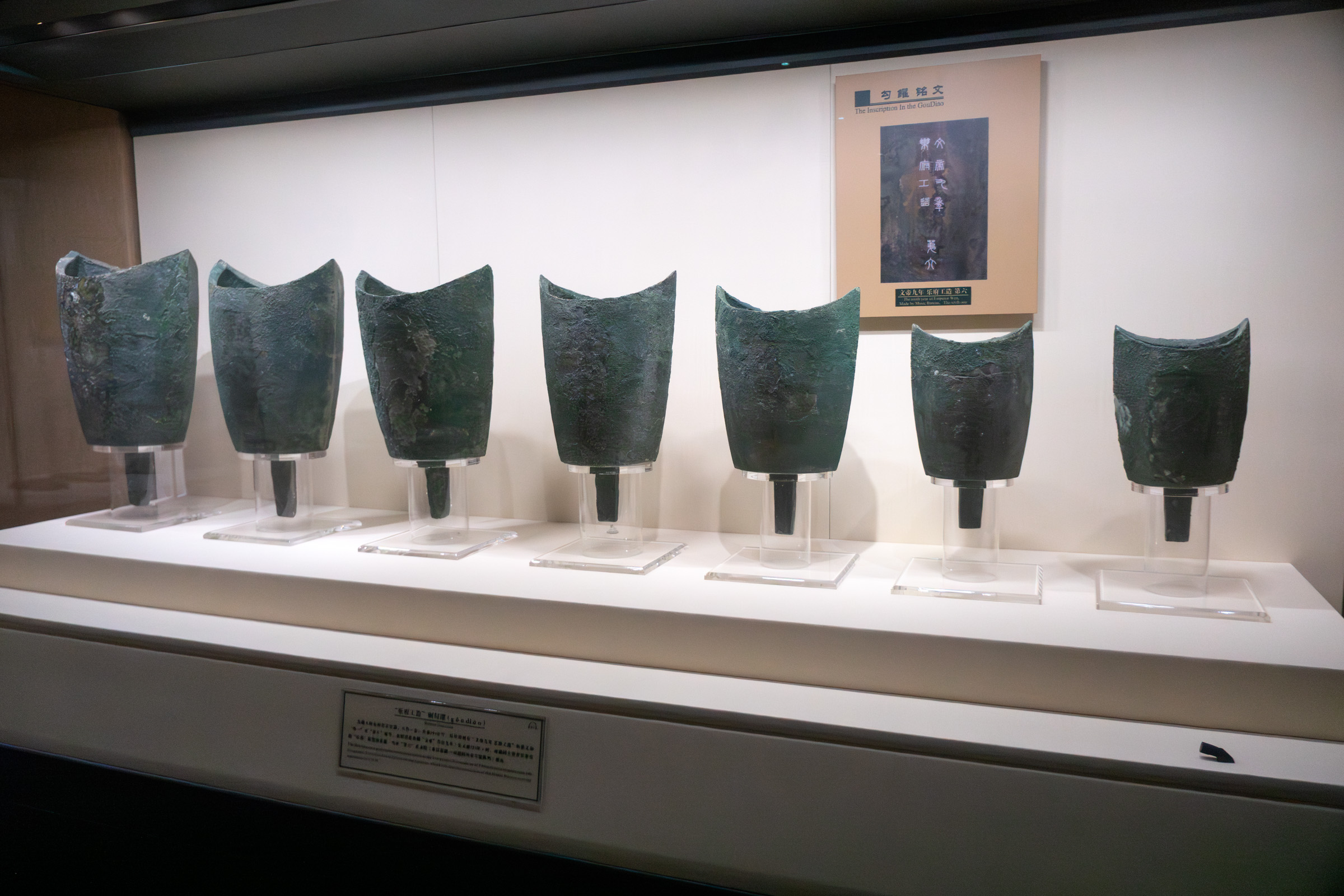
Bronze Goudiao

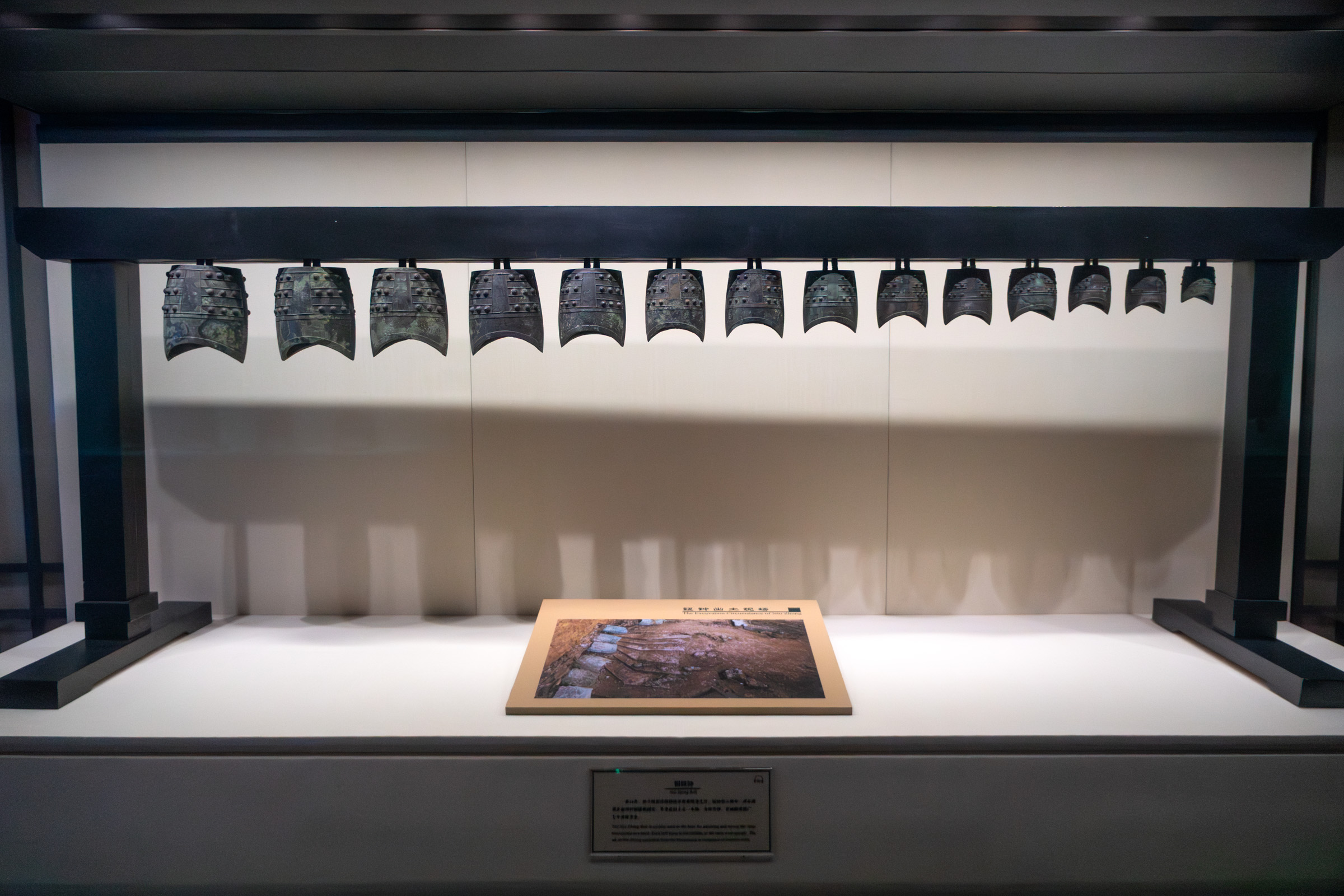
Bronze Niuzhong

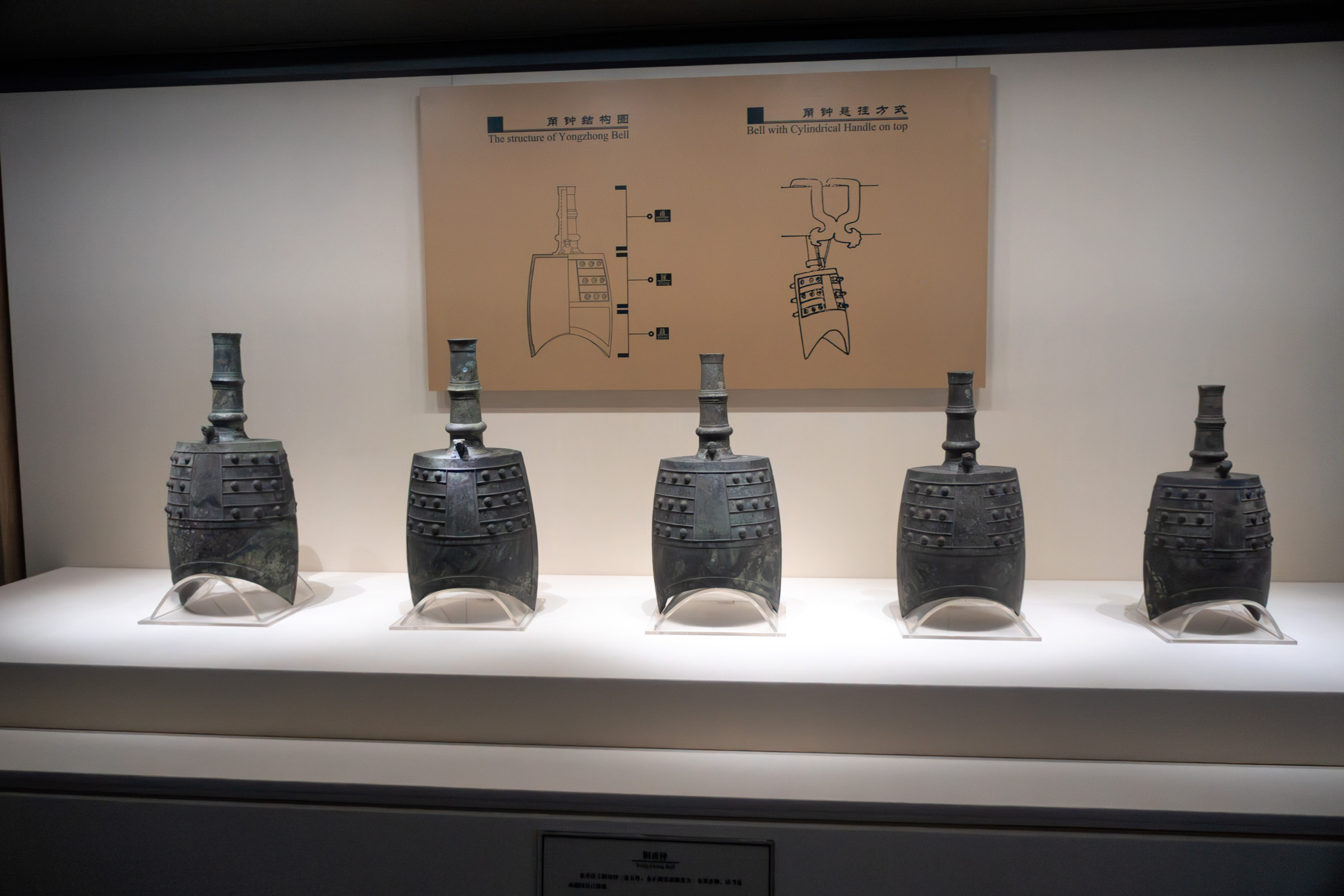
Bronze Yongzhong

=== The Exhibition of Ceramic Pillows Donated by Yeung Wing Tak Couple (Site of King's Tomb) ===
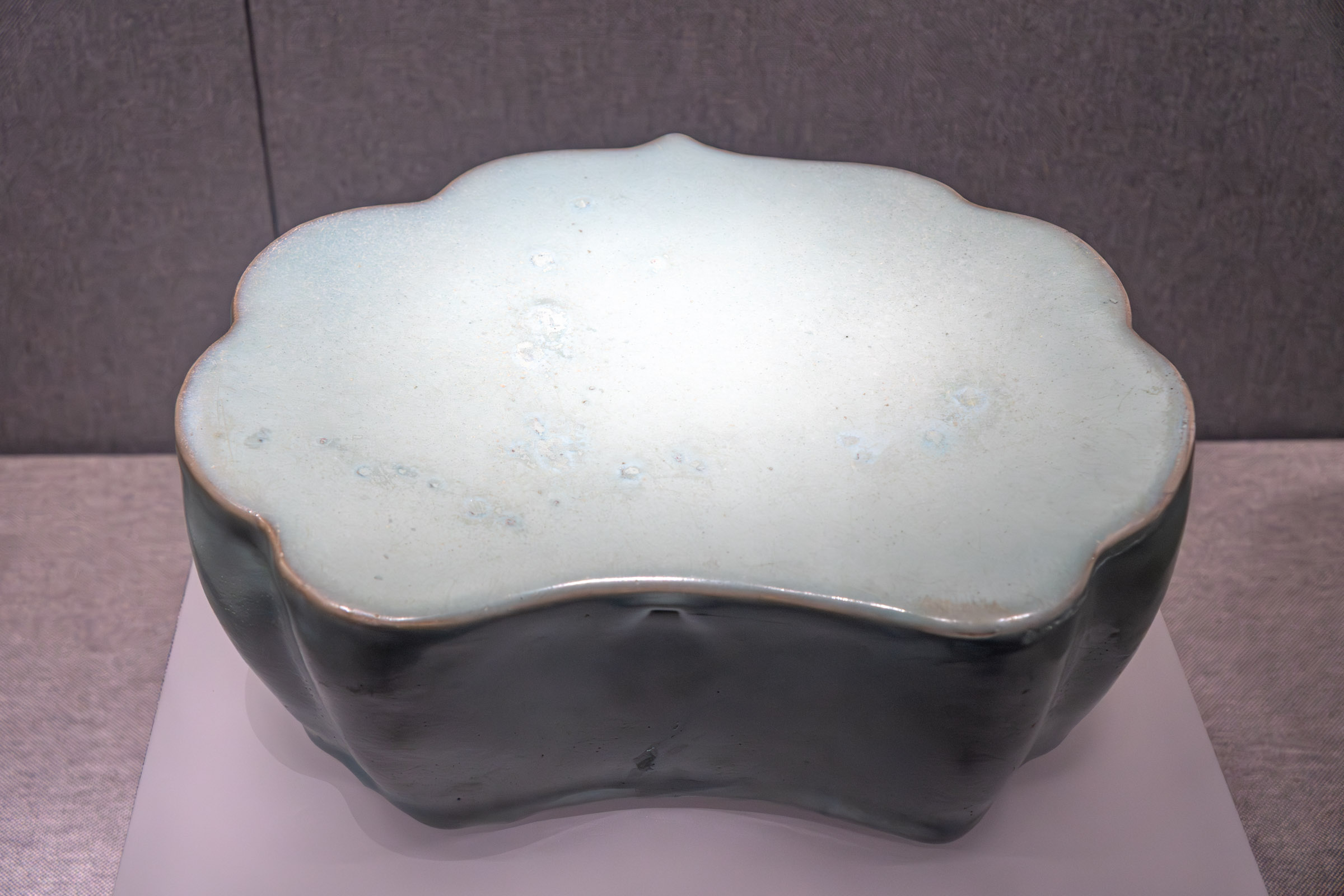
Ru ware ceramic pillow of Northern Song. The largest Ru ware existent today.

The ceramic pillows in China first appeared in Sui dynasty, and became popular in Tang, then was on the wane after its period of prosperity in Song, Jin and Yuan Dynasties. In 1992, during the inaugural phase of the Mausoleum Museum of the Nanyue King of the Western Han Dynasty, Hong Kong connoisseur-collector and industrialist Mr. Yeung Wing Tak and his wife donated over 200 ceramic pillows from their private collection to the institution. This extraordinary gift—remarkable for its quantity, diversity, and representation of kilns across China—formed the cornerstone of what would become the nation's largest and most refined collection of historical ceramic pillows. This donation elevated the Nanyue King Museum into a leading institution for Tang-Song dynasty ceramics research. The "Exhibition of Ceramic Pillows Donated by Yeung Wing Tak Couple" showcases this legacy. Updated in 2019, the display presents 152 ceramic pillows spanning the Tang Dynasty to the Republican period (7th–20th century), tracing China's 1,300-year evolutionary trajectory of pillow craftsmanship.

Beyond the Nanyue Kingdom artifacts, this collection stands as a defining feature of the museum, illustrating how private philanthropy can transform institutional scholarship while preserving intangible cultural heritage. The pillows—with their varied forms from Cizhou, Ding, Ru, and other kilns—document regional aesthetics, technological innovations, and social customs across dynasties.

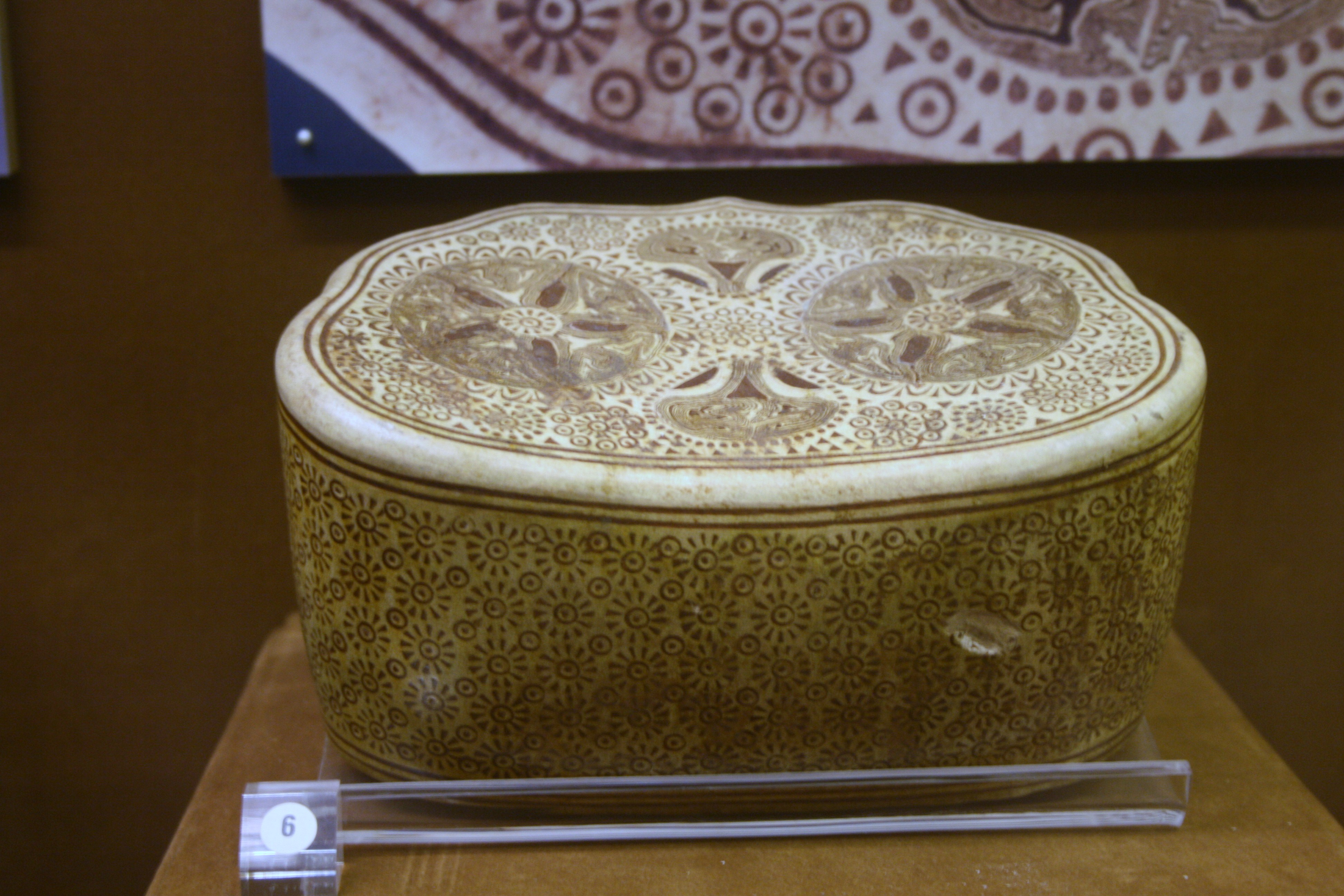
Gongxian ware of Tang dynasty.

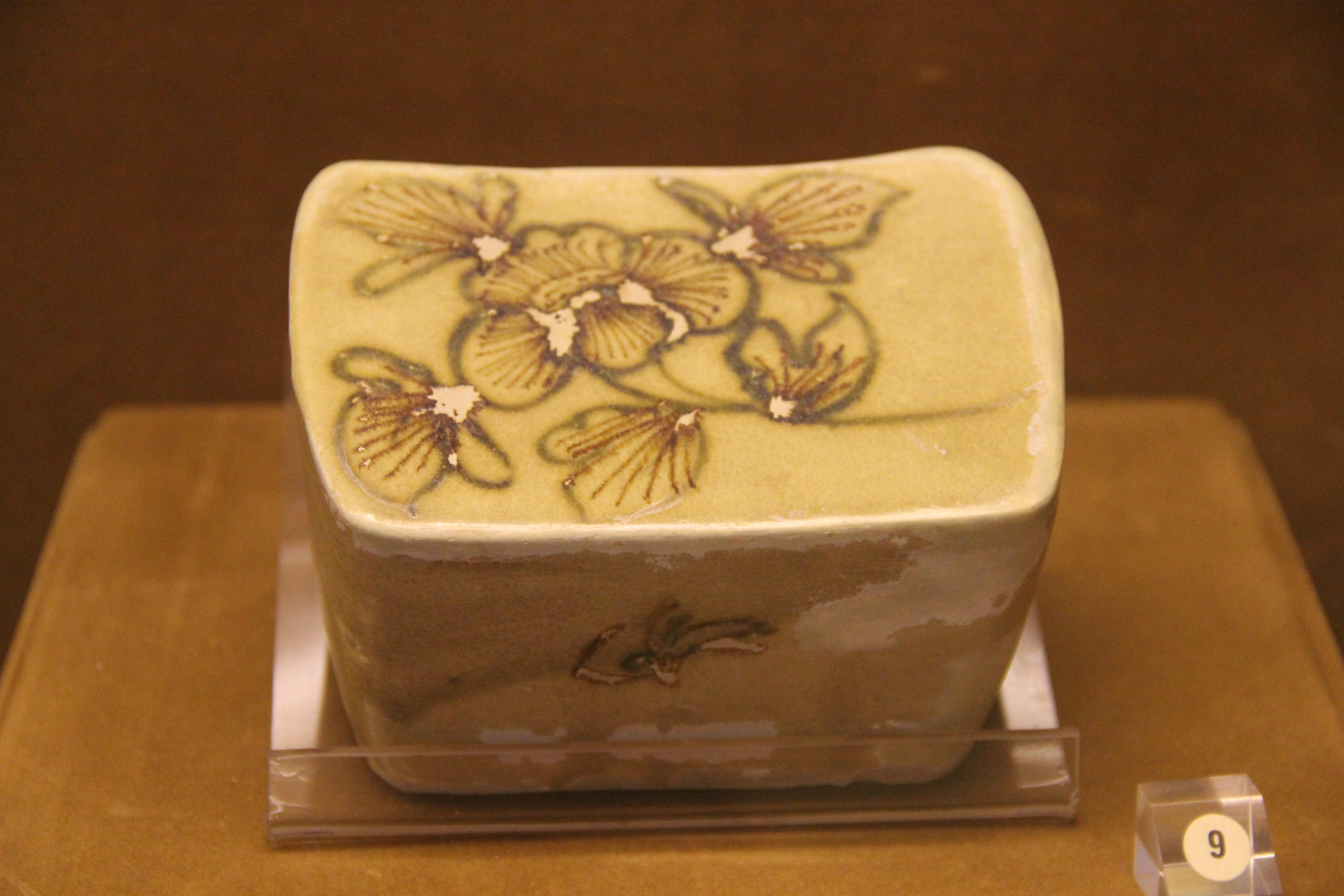
Tongguan ware of Tang dynasty

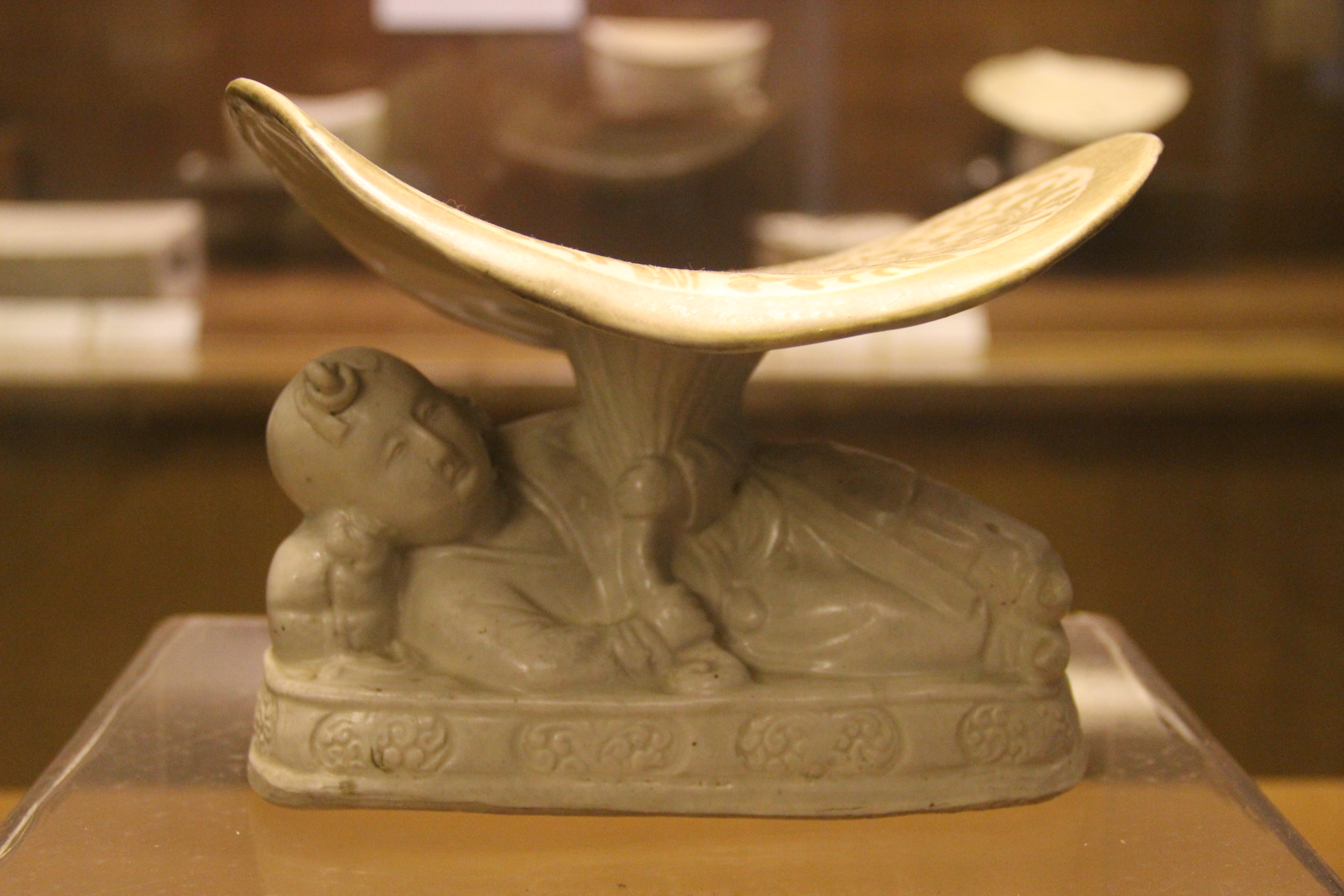
Ding ware of Jin dynasty

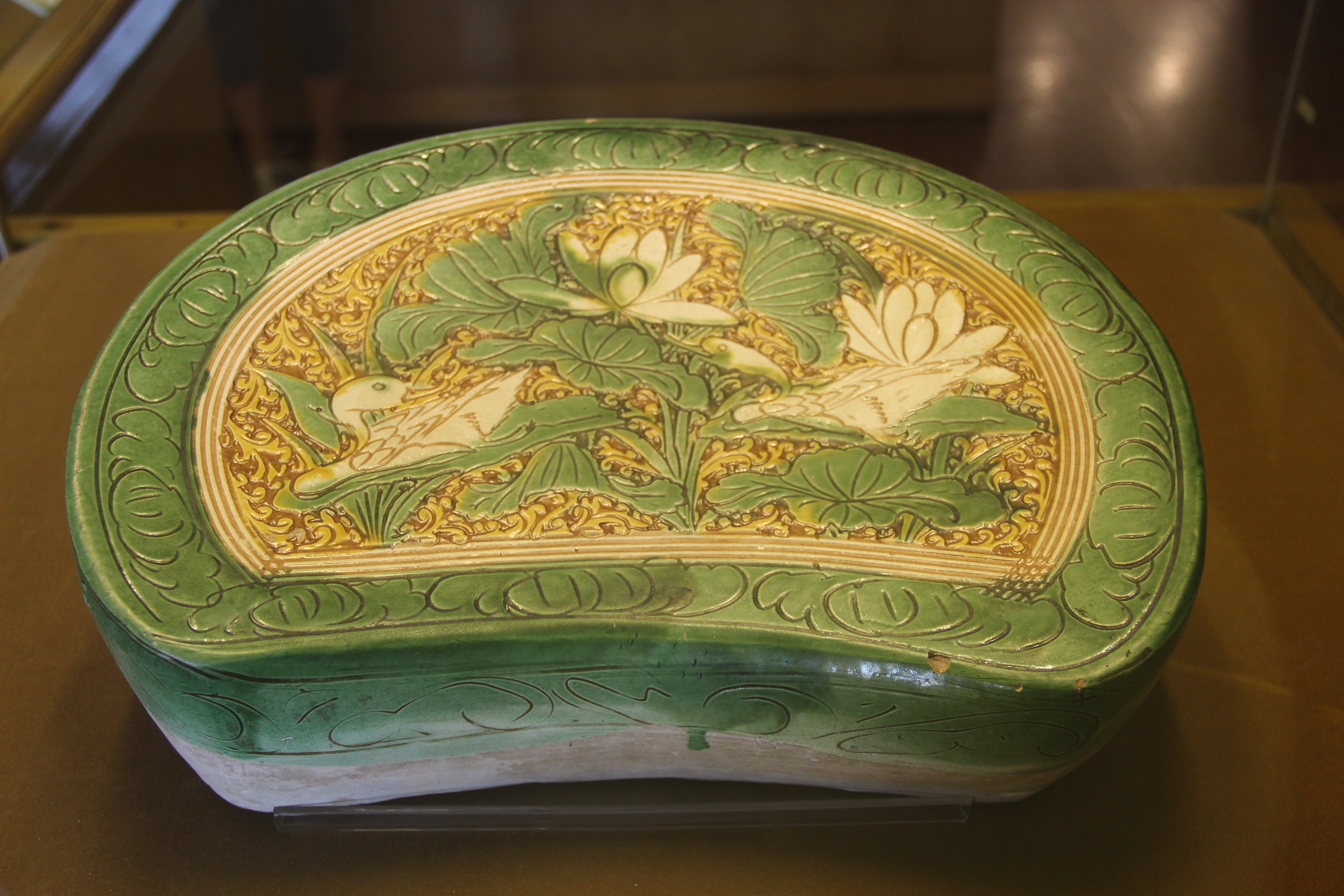
Yu ware of Northern Song dynasty

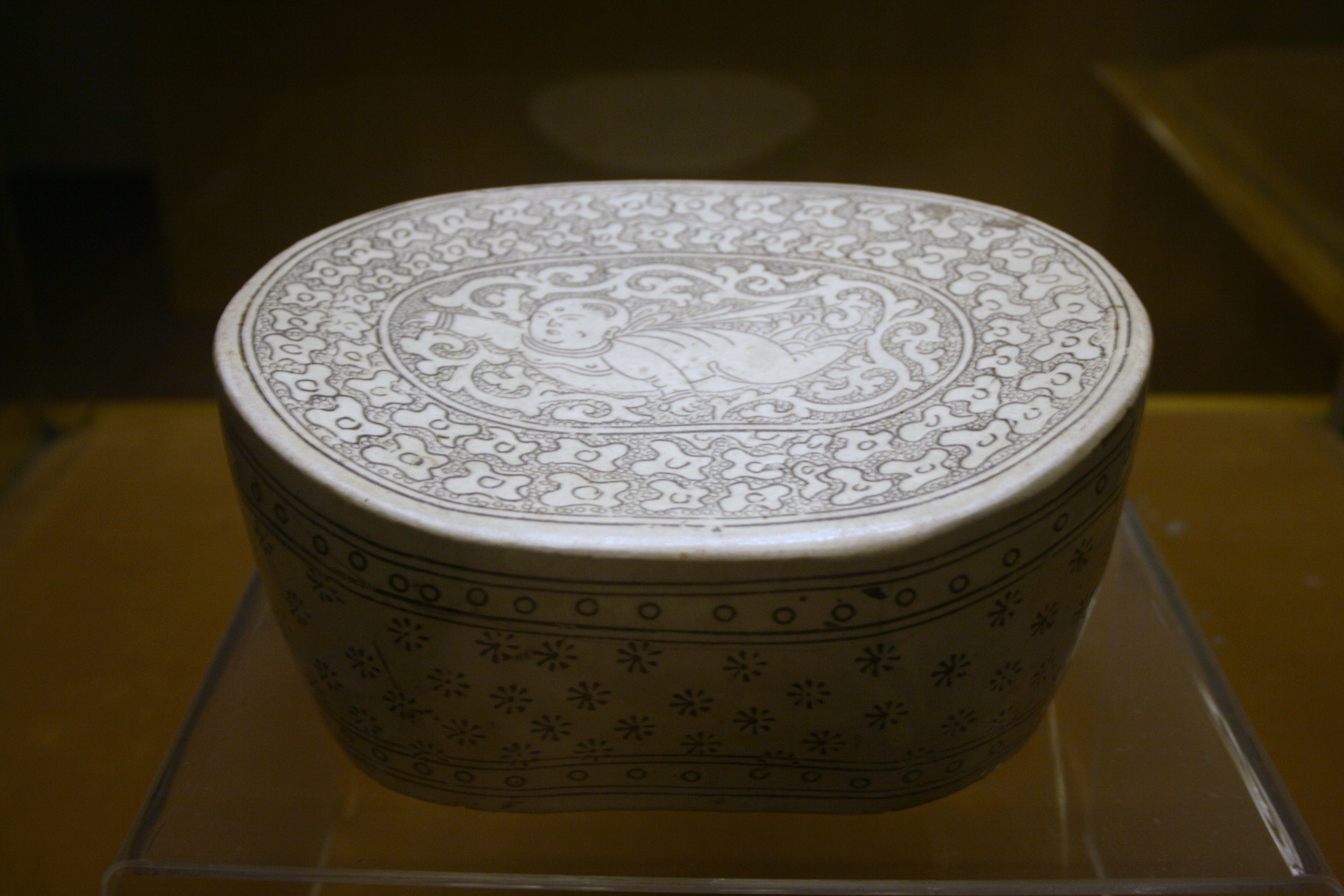
Ding ware of Northern Song dynasty

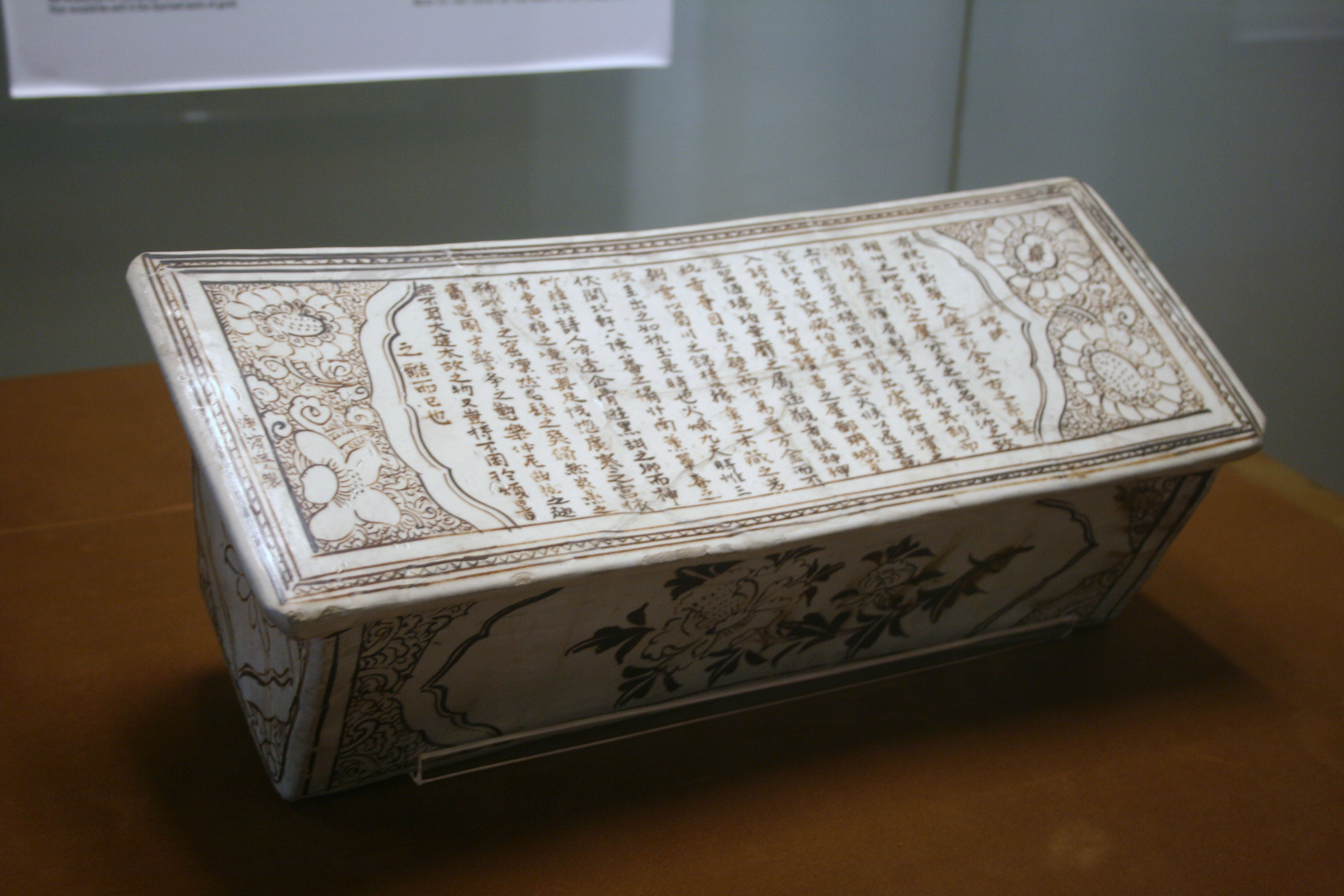
Cizhou ware of Yuan dynasty

=== The Palace of the Nanyue Kingdom (Site of Palace and Garden) ===
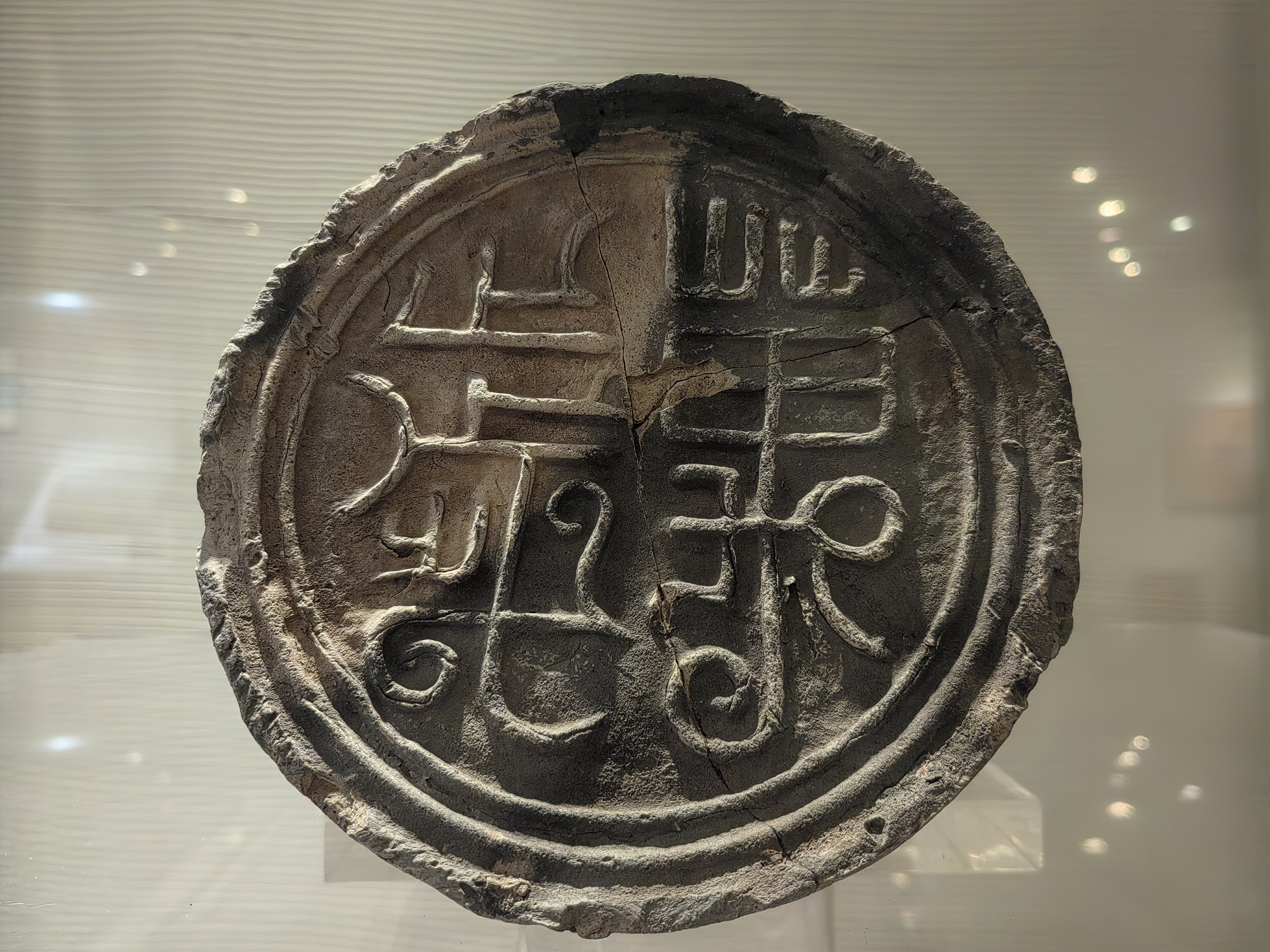
"萬歲" Wadang (eaves tile) unearthed from the ruins of the Palace of the Nanyue Kingdom

This exhibition comprehensively examines the history of the Nanyue Kingdom within China's historical framework through architectural relics and unearthed artifacts from the Site of Palace and Garden. It presents the remains of palaces, walls, and imperial gardens alongside critical construction materials such as bricks, tiles, and stone components. Significant cultural artifacts like inscribed wooden slips documenting administrative records and pottery fragments bearing economic inscriptions are contextualized to reveal the kingdom's political and socioeconomic structures. A close observation of the ruins and relics reveals science in location selection and ingenuity in landscape design, and makes one feel vividly the grandeur of the ancient kingdom.

=== The Palace of the Nanhan Kingdom (Site of Palace and Garden) ===
The exhibition showcases artifacts from the Nanhan (Southern Han) palace remains in the Site of Palace and Garden and the Mausoleums of the Kings of the Nanhan Kingdom at Xiaoguwei Island, Panyu District. Through these cultural relics, visitors experience the distinctive cultural landscape of the Southern Han Kingdom.

=== Guangzhou: a City with Two-thousand-year History and Rich Culture (Site of Palace and Garden) ===
This exhibition chronologically traces the millennia-spanning urban evolution of Guangzhou—a National Famous Historical and Cultural City—through two interconnected narratives. Centred on archaeological evidence from the Site of Palace and Garden, it integrates findings from Guangzhou's urban archaeology and historical documentation to reconstruct distinctive developmental phases across dynasties. Crucially, the display highlights Guangzhou's unparalleled continuity as an administrative centre for over 2,000 years, demonstrating how successive powers—from the Nanyue Kingdom to the Qing Dynasty—consistently maintained their governance hub at this strategic Pearl River Delta location.

== Significance ==
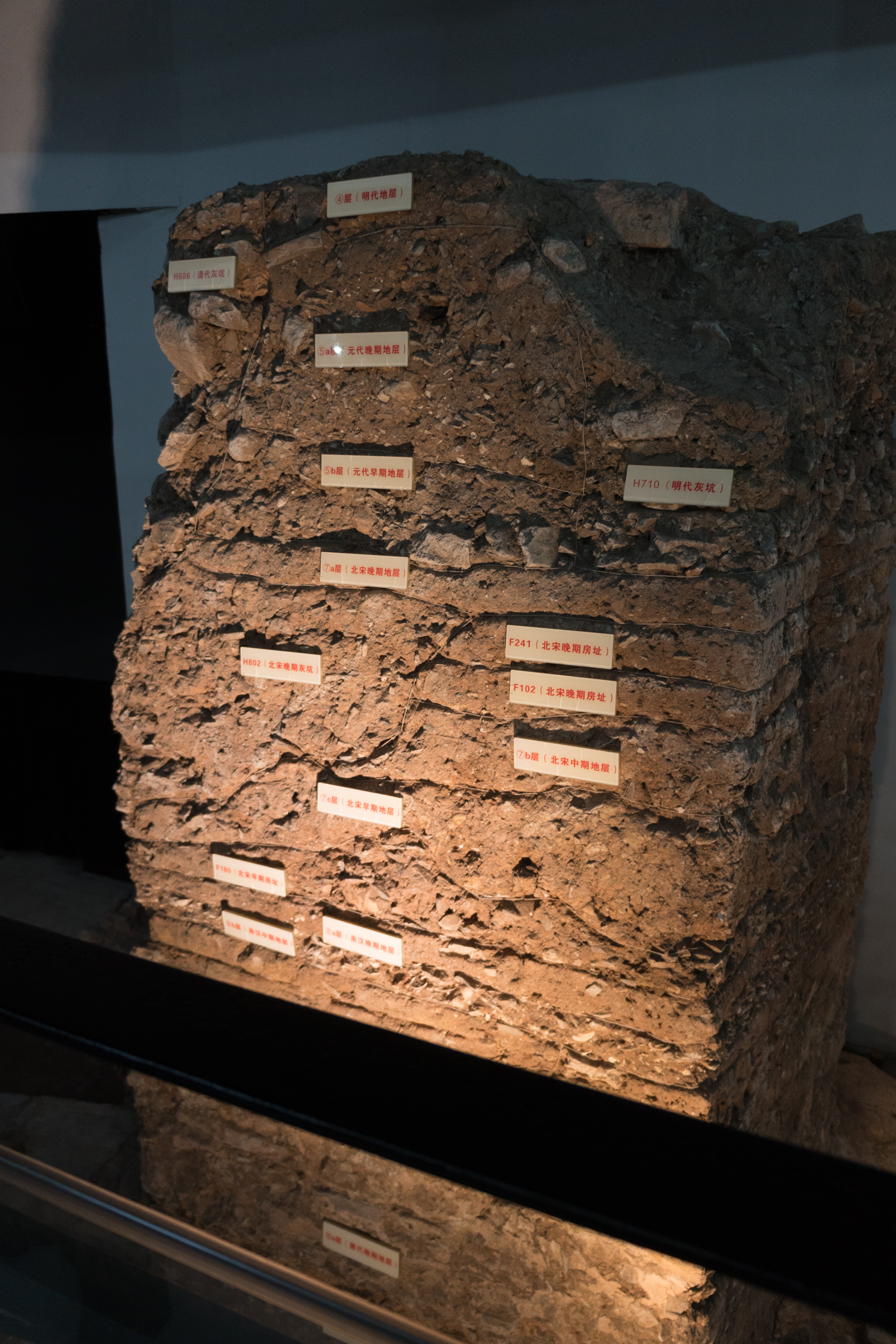
The key stratigraphic column in the Site of Palace and Garden displays the stratigraphic distribution of various dynasties.

At its zenith, the Nanyue Kingdom encompassed most of present-day Guangdong and Guangxi, parts of Fujian, Hainan, Hong Kong, Macau, and extensive territories in northern and central Vietnam. Yet historical records—primarily from the Shiji (Records of the Grand Historian) and Hanshu (Book of Han)—offer fewer than 2,000 characters, providing only an outline of the kingdom with scant detail. The Tomb of Nanyue King and Site of Palace and Garden have transformed this scarcity into revelation through their archaeological treasures. These sites provide irreplaceable material evidence that corroborates historical figures and events mentioned in classical texts along with undocumented details, possessing exceptional value across historical, scientific and artistic dimensions.

The Tomb of Nanyue King in the Site of King's Tomb is the highest-ranking and largest painted stone-chambered tomb from the Han Dynasty in the Lingnan region. Undisturbed by tomb raiders, the mausoleum is exceptionally well-preserved, yielding over 1,000 sets of funerary objects totaling more than 10,000 artifacts. These artifacts were largely found in their original positions, endowing them with significant archaeological value. They collectively illuminate various aspects of Lingnan's political, economic, and cultural landscape two millennia ago, holding crucial research significance for the early development history of Lingnan, Qin-Han archaeology, and the origins of the Maritime Silk Road. Maritime Silk Road treasures unearthed from the tomb—such as the silver box, gold floral appliqués, bronze jar with boat pattern, frankincense, and ivory—bear witness to cultural exchanges between China and foreign lands over two thousand years ago. Artifacts including seals, jade objects, food vessels, and musical instruments demonstrate how the Lingnan region during the Qin-Han period absorbed advanced cultural elements from Zhongyuan (the Central Plains) and progressively integrated them into a diverse cultural identity.

The Palace of the Nanyue Kingdom in the Site of Palace and Garden preserves cultural relics spanning from the Qin-Han period to the Republic of China era. These remains stand as crucial historical testimony to Guangzhou's over 2,200 years of urban history and the rise and development of China's ancient Maritime Silk Road, embodying the essence of Guangzhou as a renowned historical and cultural city. The multiple layers of ruins discovered at the site confirm its uninterrupted status as Guangzhou's urban center for more than 2,200 years—a phenomenon exceptionally rare in Chinese urban development history. This demonstrates the advanced planning concepts behind the Nanyue Kingdom's original site selection, holding significant academic value for the study of ancient Chinese capitals and architectural history, as well as practical relevance for researching sustainable development in modern cities. The Pan Pond discovered in 1995 and the Crooked Stone Brook unearthed in 1997 (both designated as China's Top Ten Archaeological Discoveries of their respective years) represent the earliest and best-preserved examples of Qin-Han imperial gardens found to date. They are the earliest and most intact imperial garden complexes yet discovered in China and constitute the origin of the Lingnan garden—one of China's three major landscape architecture styles. Large-scale architectural components excavated from the site, such as square tiles measuring 95 cm per side, remain unparalleled; no similarly sized Han Dynasty building elements have been found even at the Han Dynasty capital site of Chang'an.

The "Sites of the Southern Yue State" and "Maritime Silk Road" projects, with the Tomb of Nanyue King and the Palace of the Nanyue Kingdom as key heritage sites, have now been included in China's Tentative List for World Heritage inscription.

== Access ==
Tickets for both sites can be purchased or reserved on the official WeChat account of Nanyue King Museum (南越王博物院).

=== The Site of King's Tomb ===
Admission fee: 10 yuan

Address: No. 867 Jiefang North Road, Guangzhou, Guangdong Province, China

Metro: 215 Yuexiu Park station

Bus: Yuexiu Parkt station, Jiefang North Road station, Panfu Road station

=== The Site of Palace and Garden ===
Admission fee: Free

Address: No. 316 Zhongshan 4th Road, Guangzhou, Guangdong Province, China

Metro: 109 213 Gongyuanqian station, 110 Peasant Movement Institute station

Bus: the Provincial Finance Department station

== See also ==
- National first-grade museums of China
- Nanyue
- Southern Han
- Triệu dynasty
- Zhao Mo
- Southward expansion of the Han dynasty
