= Vietnamese architecture =

Regional architecture style

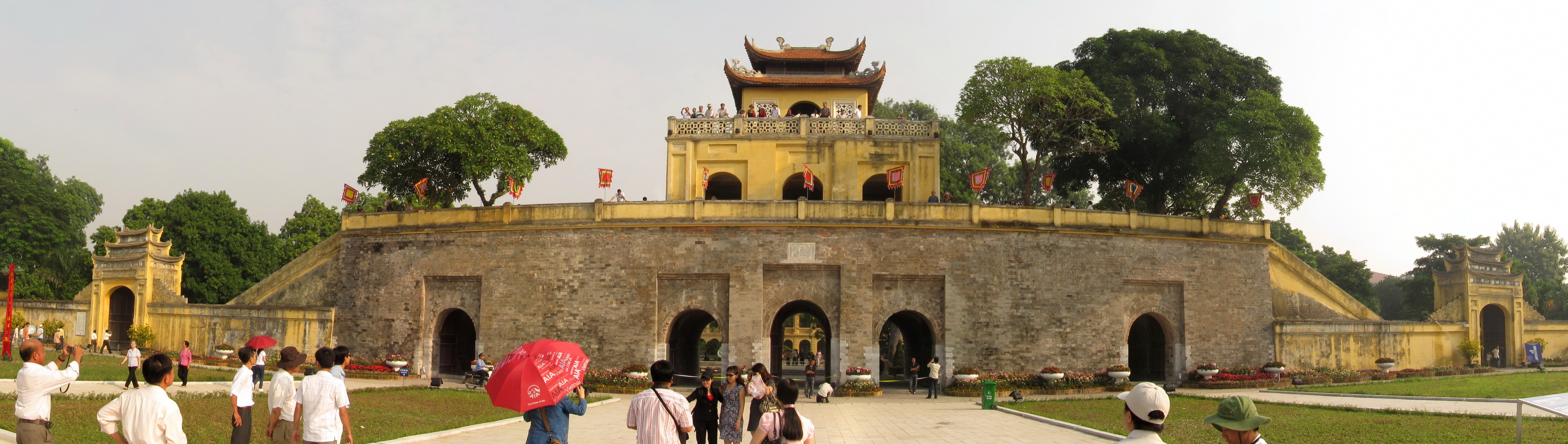
The architecture of the Hanoi citadel gate, Thăng Long Imperial Citadel of the Revival Lê period

Vietnamese architecture (Vietnamese: Kiến trúc Việt Nam) refers to the structural style and aesthetic features of the Vietnamese throughout history, including the influence and integration of regional and global architectural styles. Vietnamese architecture emerged from the need for shelter and the unique challenges presented by a tropical climate. Vietnamese architecture can be reflected from ceremonial buildings to infrastructure. Notable examples of this are đình, shrines, temples, nhà thờ họ, citadels, palaces, etc. There are three main architectural eras: Ancient, Dynastic and Modern.

== Ancient architecture ==
Ancient Vietnamese architecture prior to Chinese influence utilized thatching and elevated floors to protect against wild animals. Building materials were typically wood and bamboo. Depictions of these houses can be seen on Đông Sơn bronze drums. There are two types of houses, identified by their distinct roof shape with one curved up like boats and the other down like turtle shells. In 2nd century BC, An Dương Vương instructed the Cổ Loa citadel to be built with a spiral shape and was the first citadel built in Vietnam. Thus the name Cổ Loa, cổ meaning ancient and loa meaning spiral: ancient spiral.

== Dynastic architecture ==
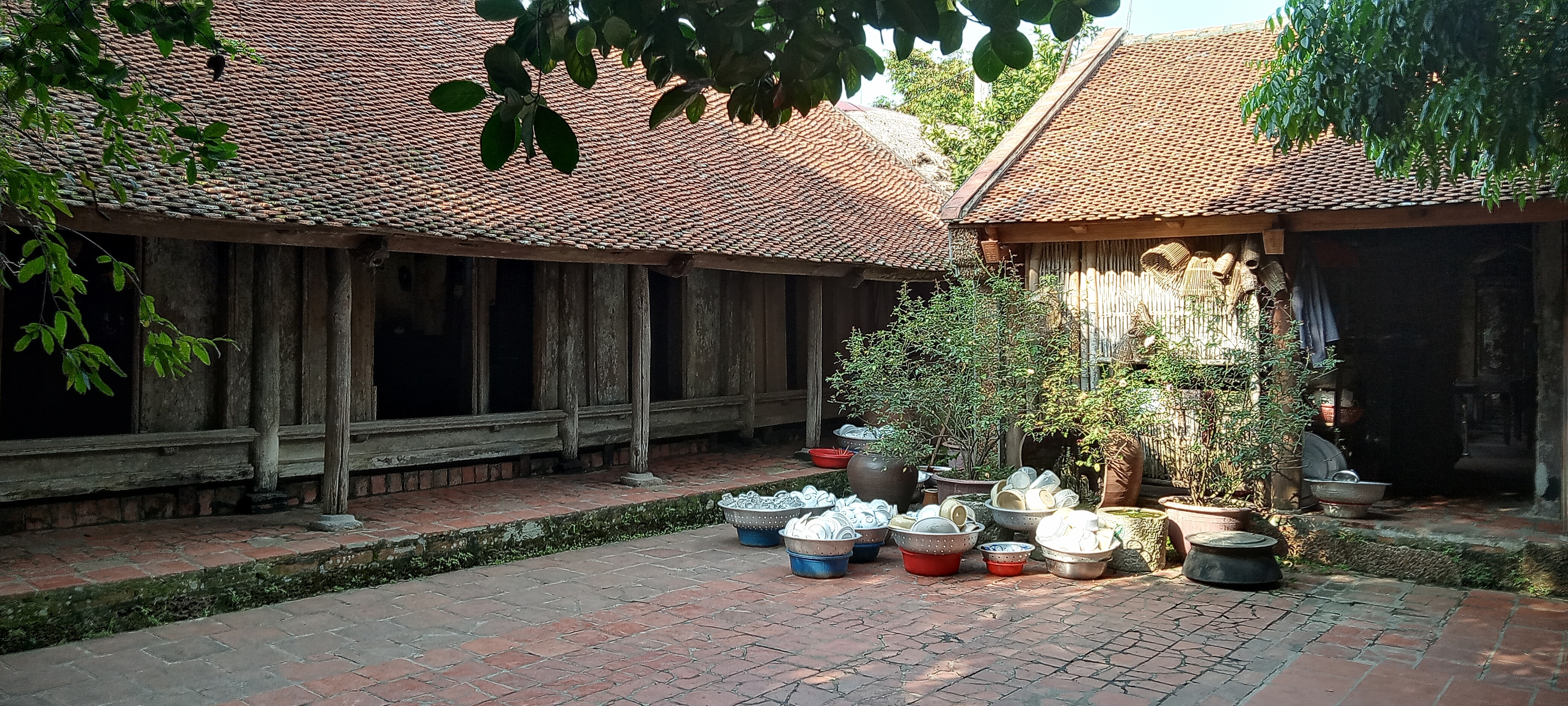
Traditional house in the north of Vietnam

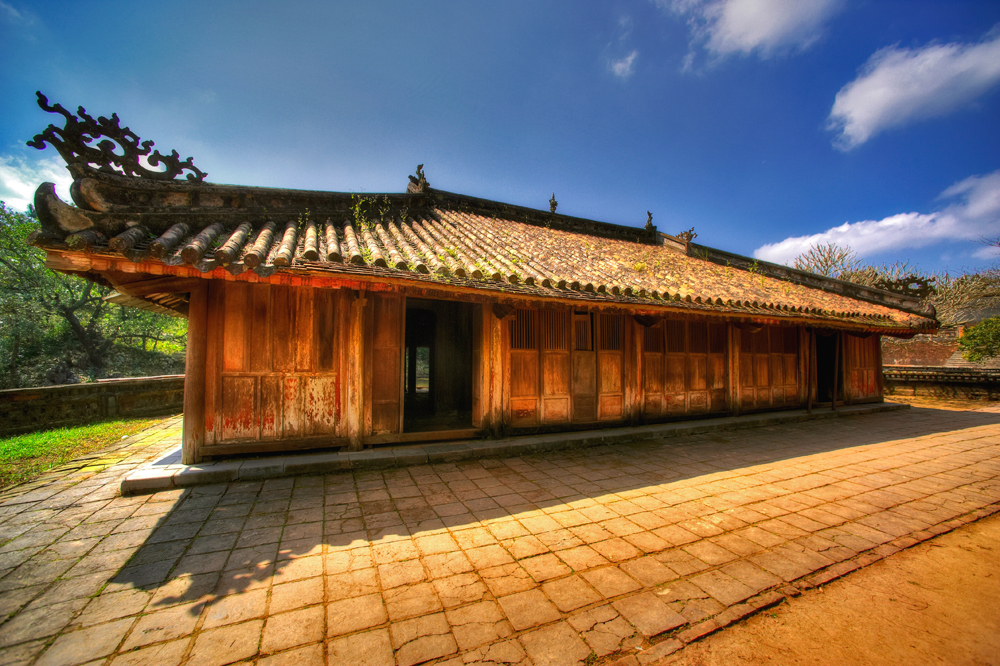
Traditional house in central Vietnam

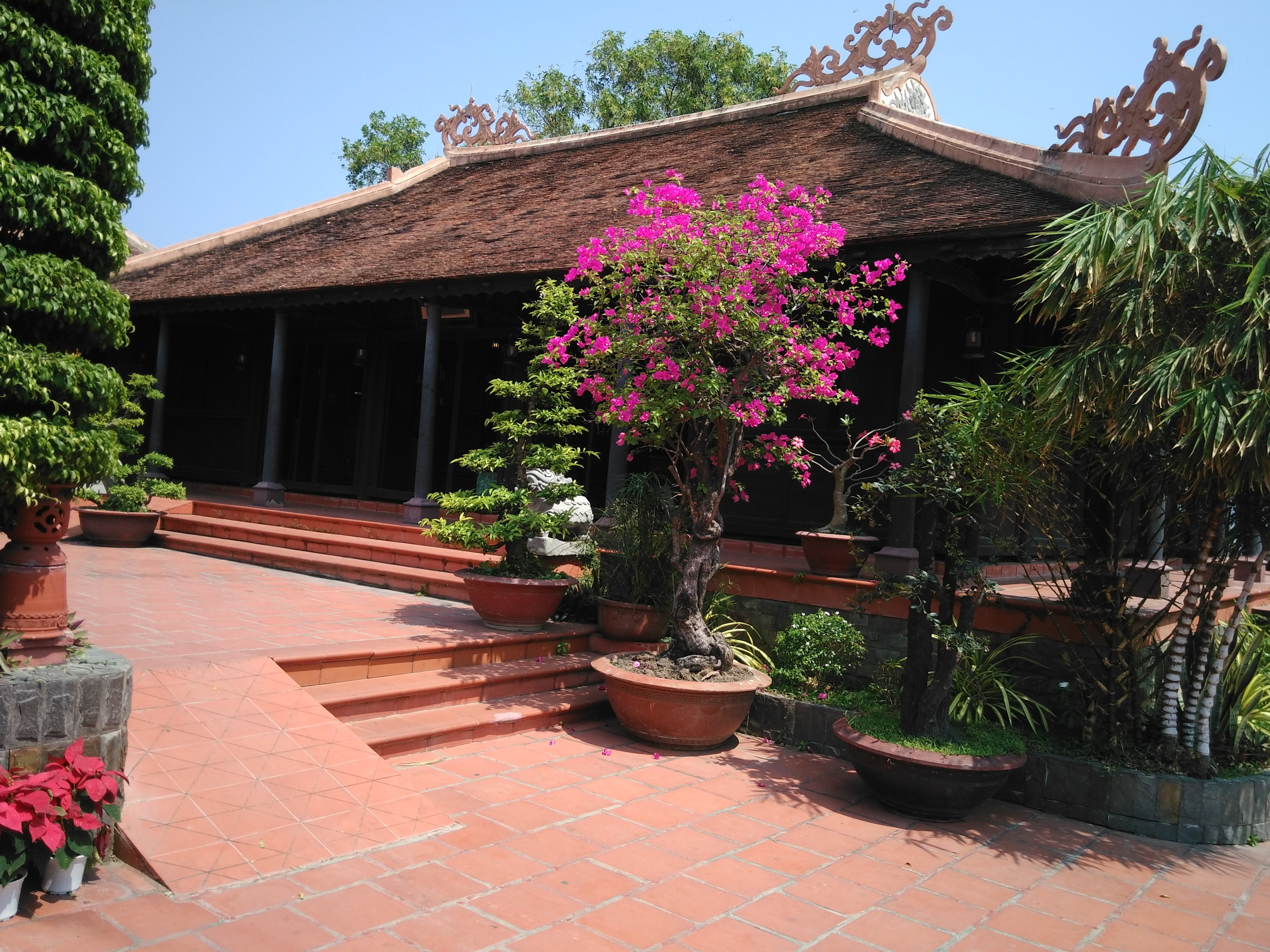
Traditional house in the south of Vietnam

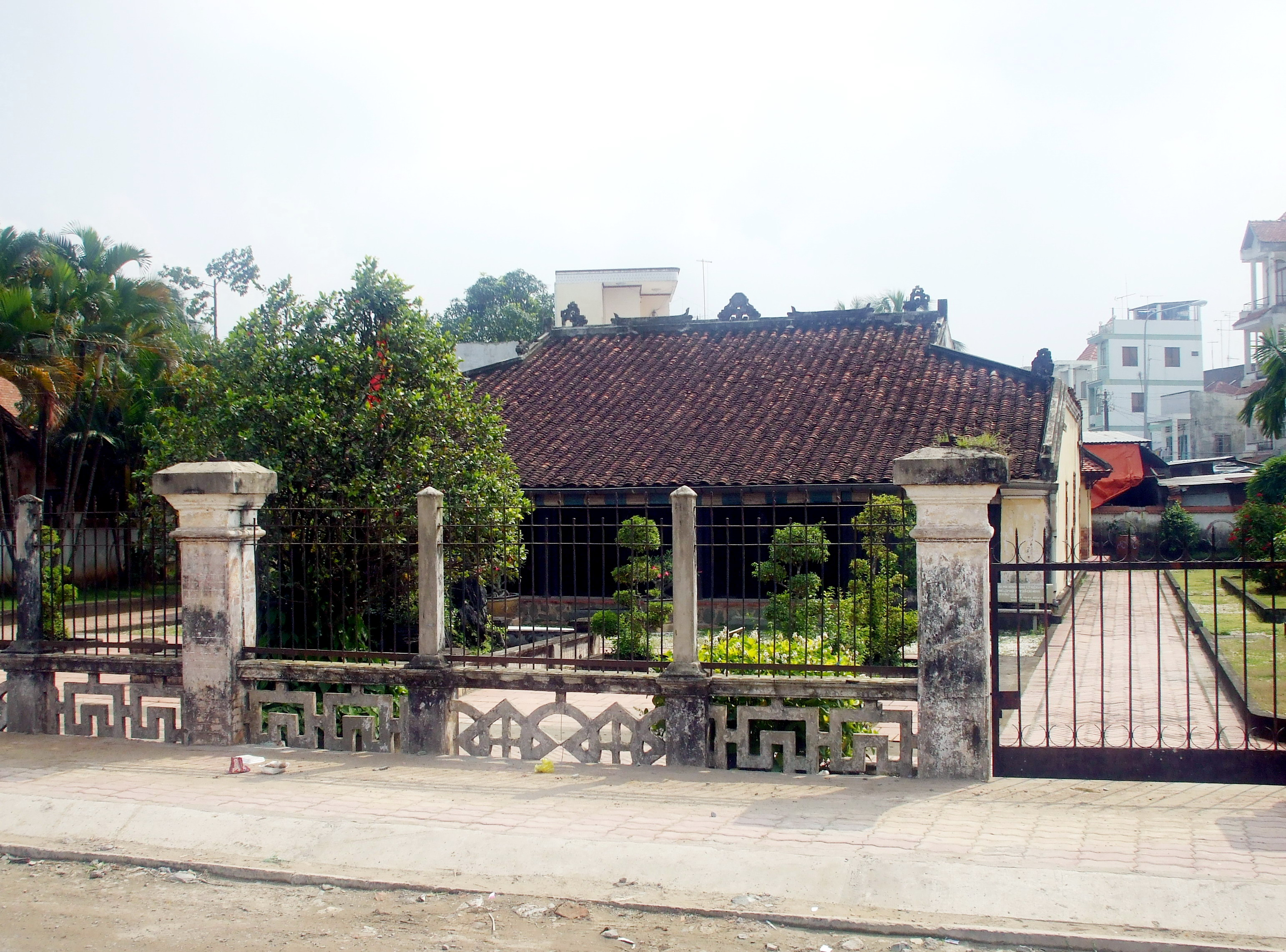
Traditional house in the south of Vietnam

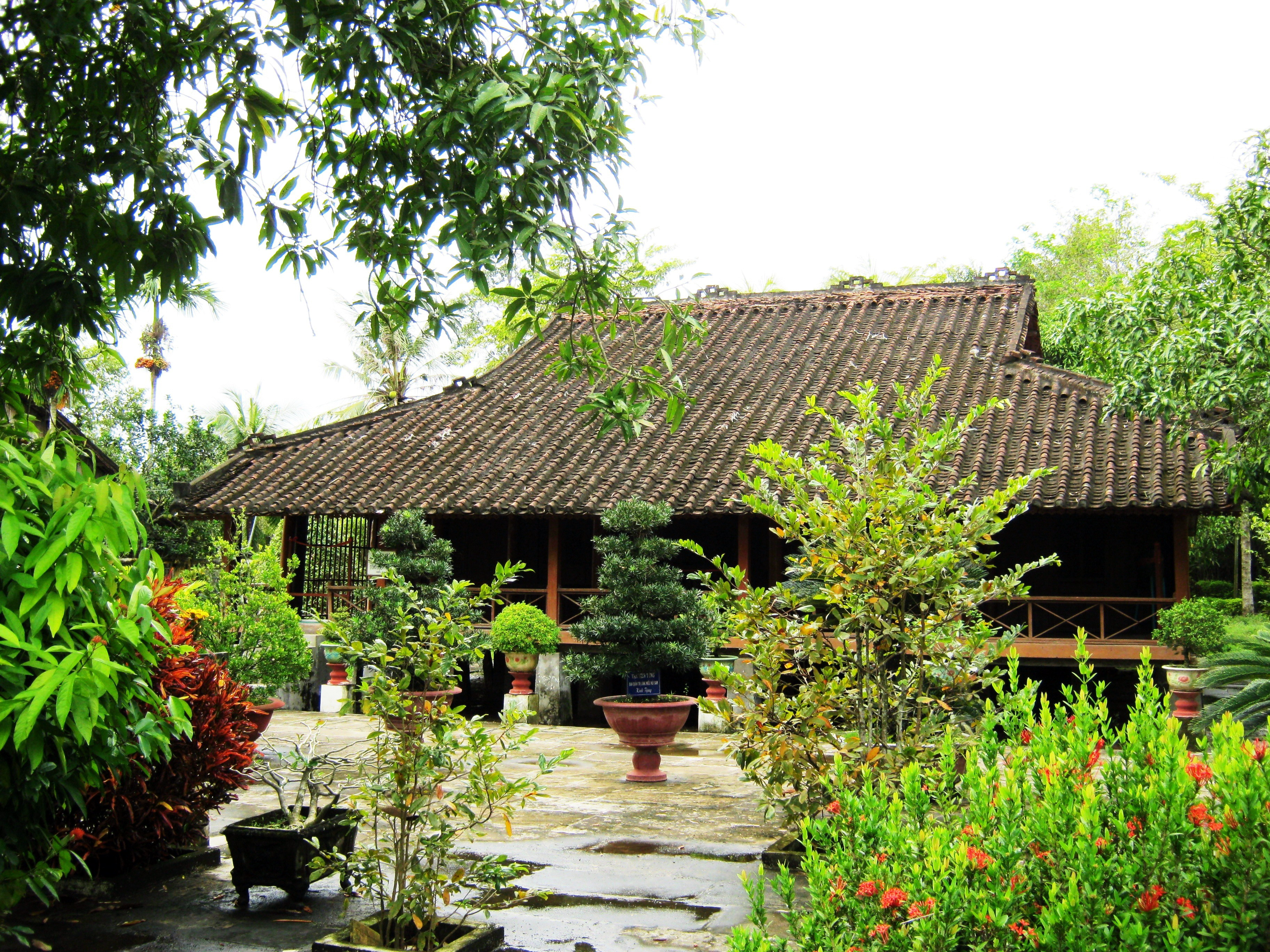
Traditional stilt house in the south of Vietnam

Vietnamese architecture has been influenced by Chinese and Buddhist architecture.

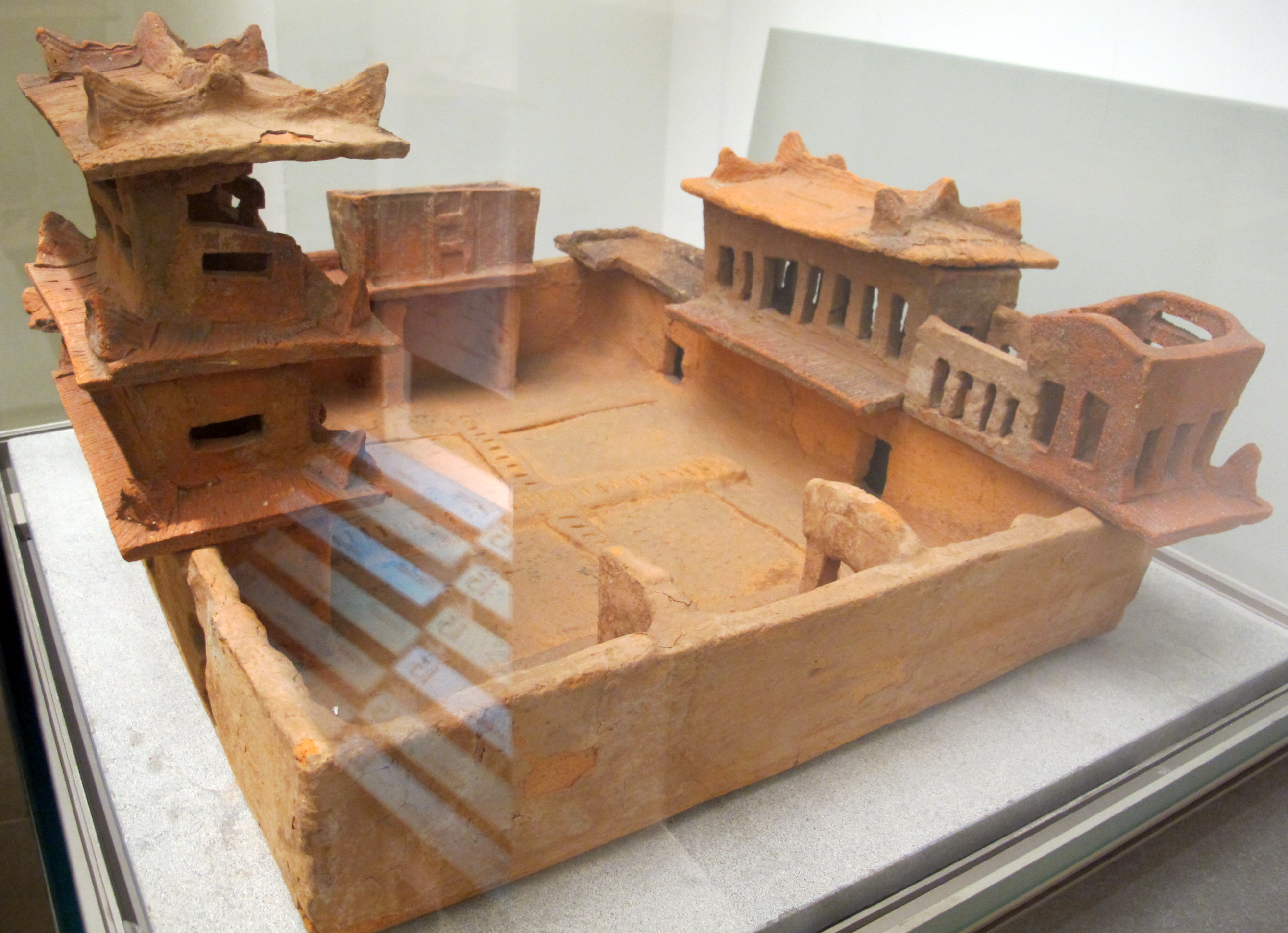
Model of terracotta house (about 1st to 3rd century AD

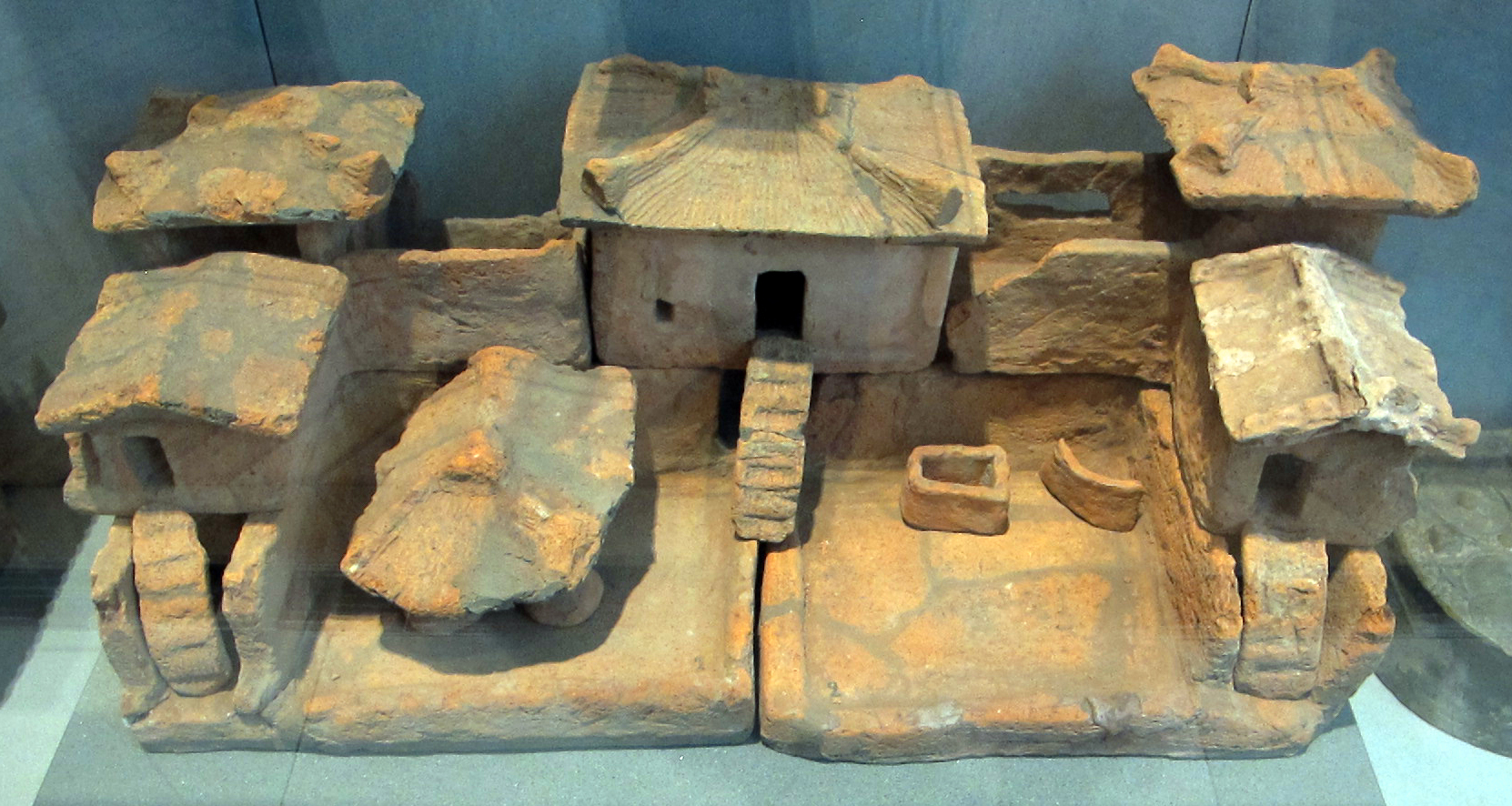
Model of terracotta house (about 1st to 3rd century AD

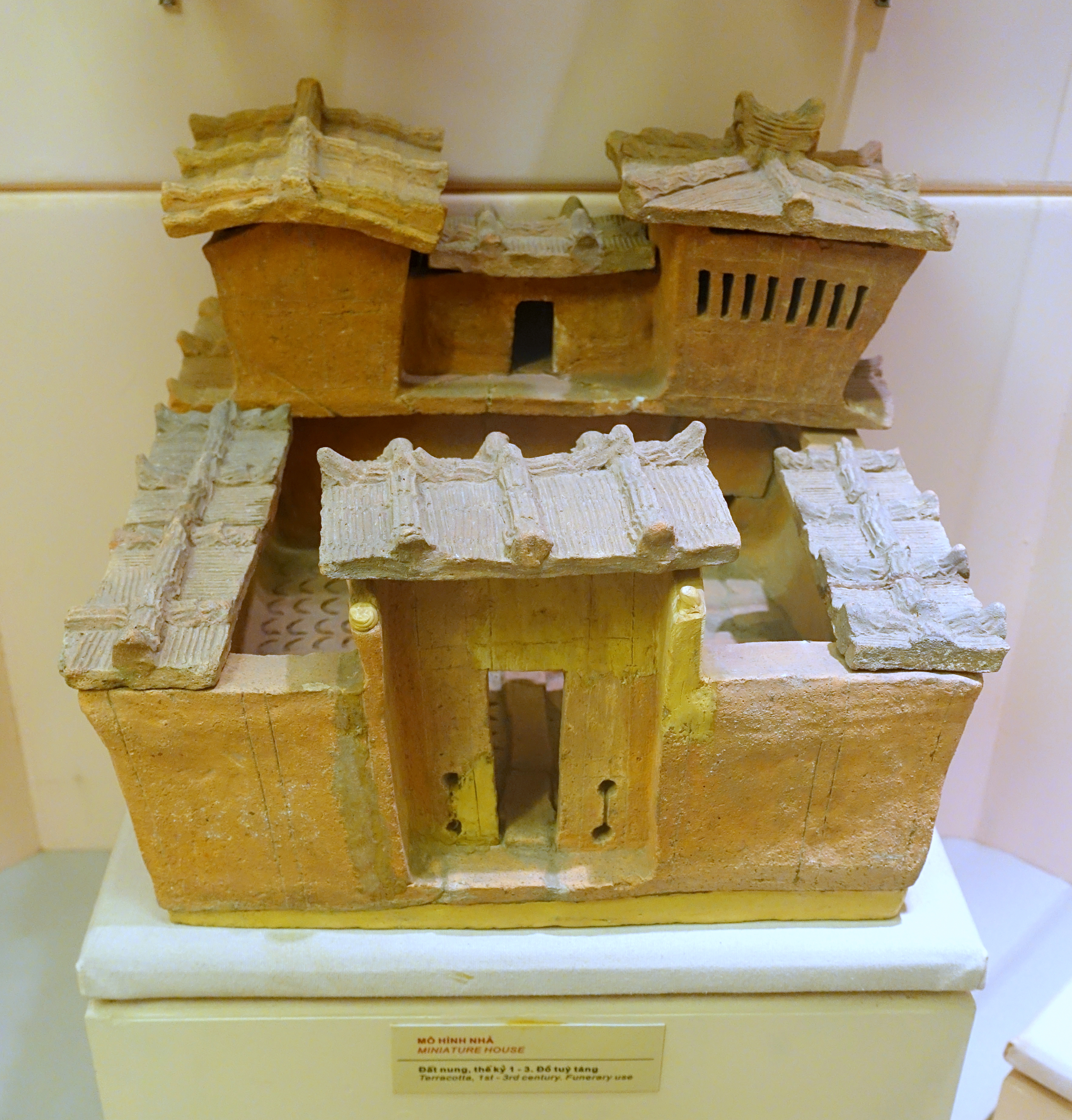
Miniature house for funerary use, 1st–3rd century AD, terracotta – National Museum of Vietnamese History – Hanoi, Vietnam

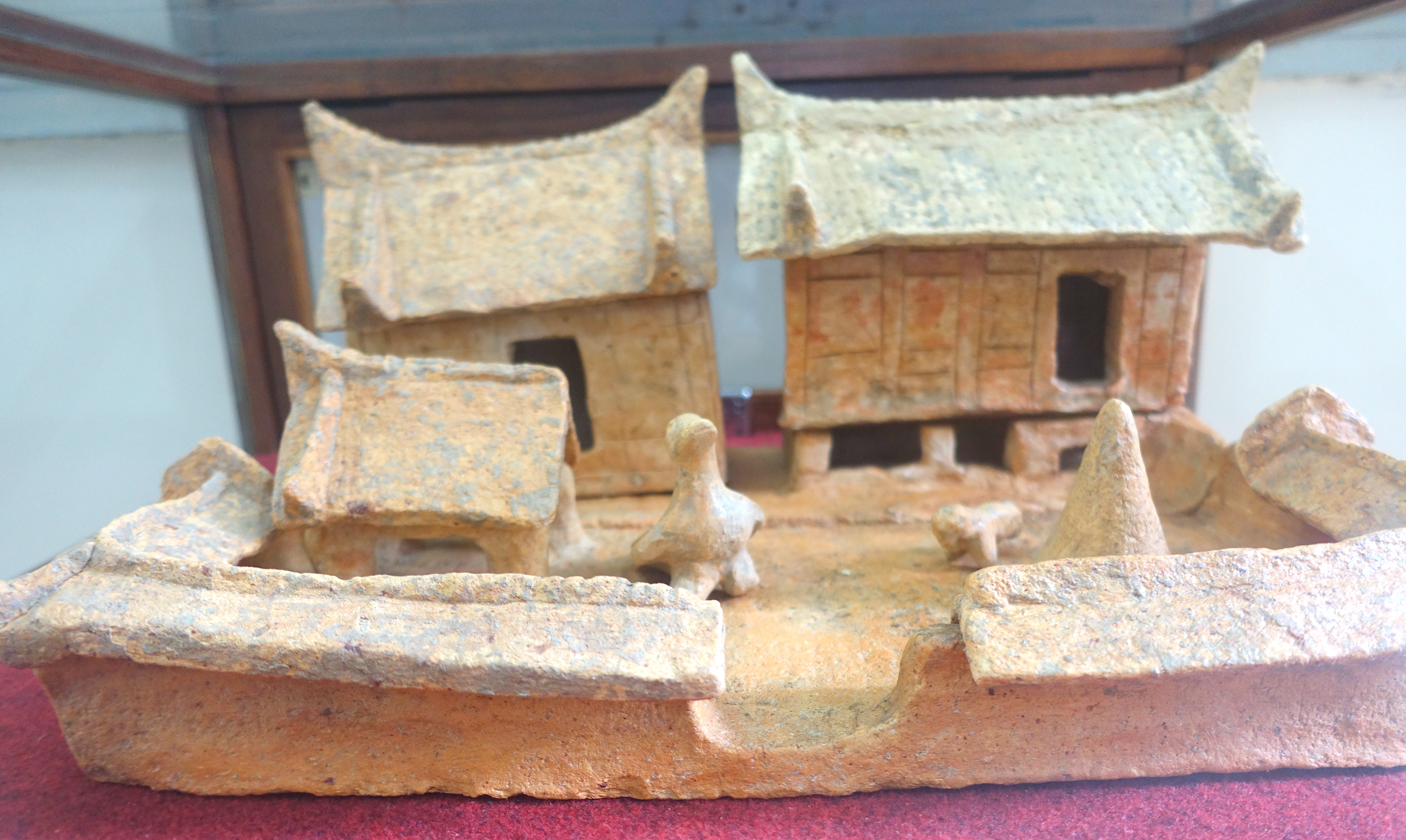
Model of house and well, Thanh Hóa province, 1st-3rd century AD, earthenware - Museum of Vietnamese History - Ho Chi Minh City

- Before the Ngô dynasty: When China invaded, the Chinese officials attempted to suppress the local culture; they melted bronze drums to attain bronze and assimilated the Lạc Việt people. The culture was gradually being assimilated and influenced by Chinese culture. Military officers built ramparts and mansions; Chinese people immigrated and built Chinese style houses.
- Lý dynasty: When Ngô Quyền won independence, it opened up a new era for the nation. Chinese architecture continued to influence Vietnamese architecture. The palace was built of wood, with a white and blue glazed tiled roof. After the Lý dynasty took over, the dynasty oversaw many reforms and kept the peace; this allowed the culture and the economy of Đại Việt to develop, and for Đại Việt itself to become prosperous. The Imperial capital was moved to Thăng Long from Hoa Lư. Architecture during this time was more developed: ramparts were built with stone and bricks, the palace's loft was made of long, colored wood planks, and curved tiled roofs were embellished with intricate and decorative statues of leaves, dragons, and phoenixes.
- Trần dynasty: Architecture used during this period was similar to the architecture used by the Lý dynasty but was developed further. The architecture still consists of three main buildings: tiền đường, thiên hương, and Upper Palace, as well as the garden and ornamental plants. The outstanding works that have survived until now are Bình Sơn Pagoda and Phổ Minh Pagoda.
- Hồ dynasty: The architecture was inherited from the Lý–Trần dynasties. The Hồ dynasty was short-lived, but developed one of the most outstanding examples of Vietnamese architecture, the Tây Đô citadel.
- Lê dynasty: Wooden palace architecture flourished, roofed with yellow and green glazed tiles. Folk art developed through carvings on communal houses and pagodas. Remaining outstanding works are the Bảng Communal and Tây Phương Temples and the ancient town of Hội An. At this time, the region first came into contact with Western culture.

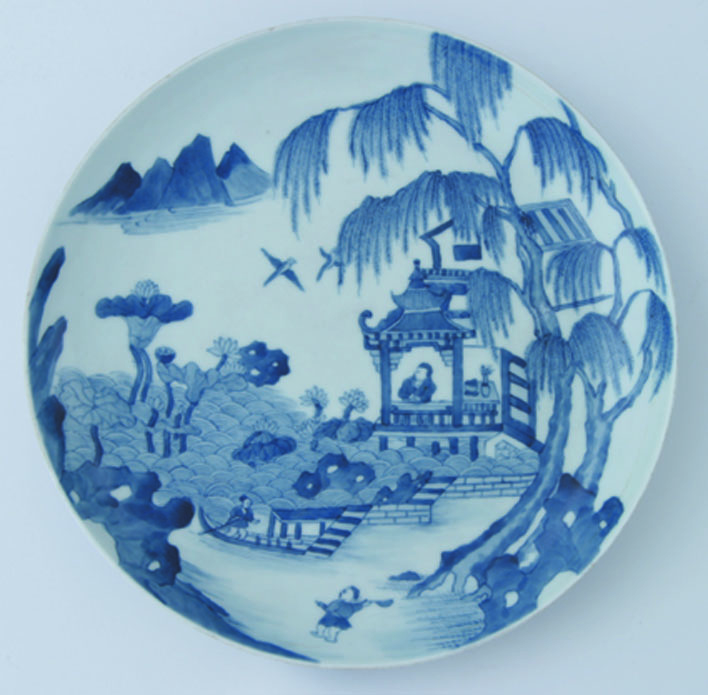
Architecture of the Lê dynasty on ceramics

- Nguyễn dynasty: Phú Xuân Imperial city (Imperial City of Huế) was made of bricks built with French architecture influence. It was a citadel with a moat around it. The palace's upper floors consist of brightly colored wood, roofed with yellow and green glazed tiles. In the North, people built wooden or thatched houses. People in the Central and South regions built rường houses.
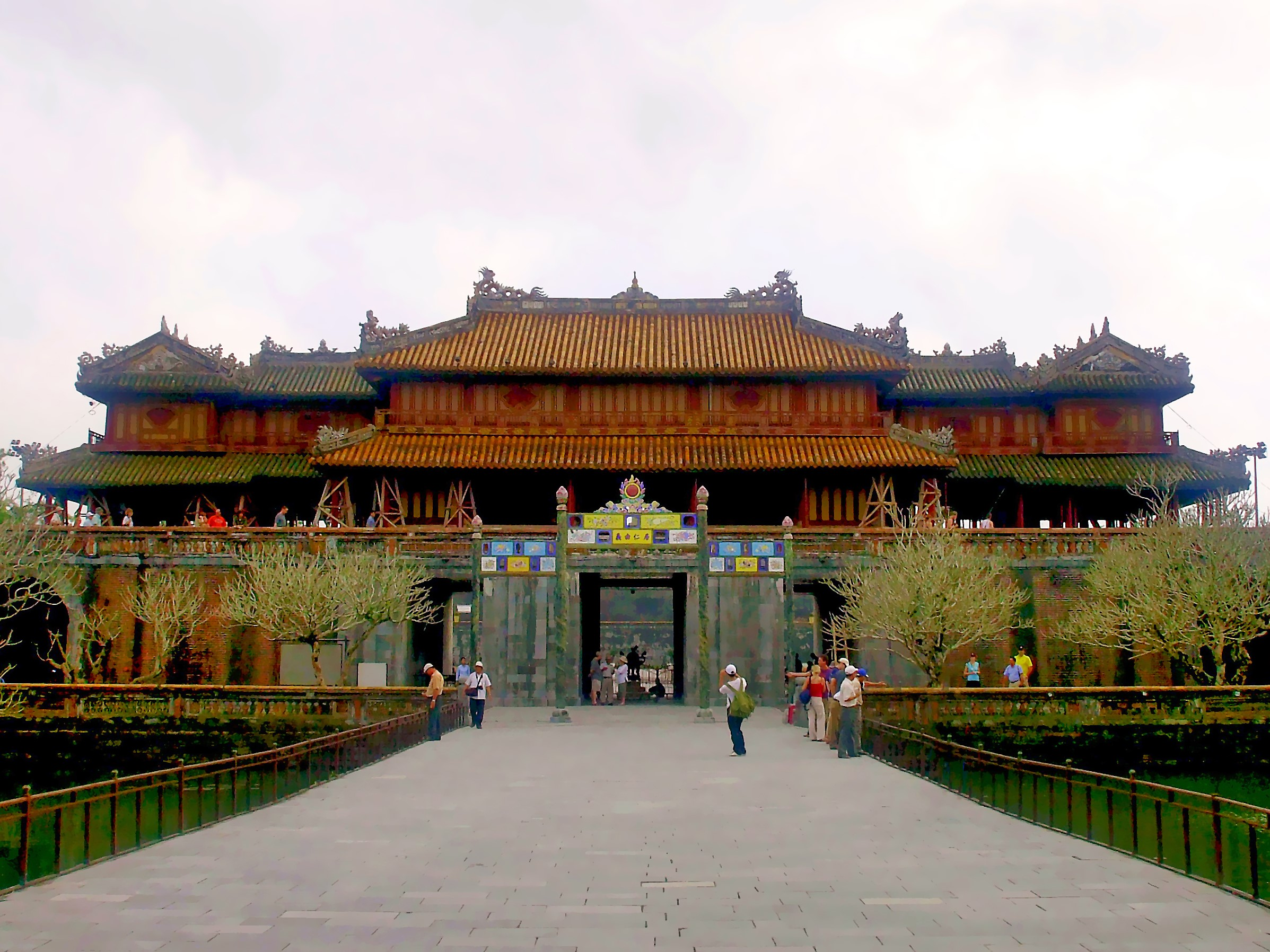
  Ngọ Môn – Huế imperial architecture, Nguyễn dynasty

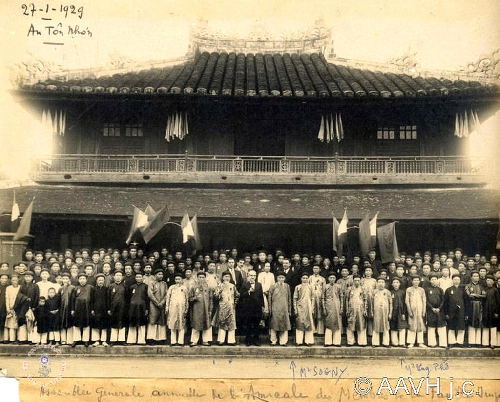
Tôn Nhơn Phủ, an architecture of the Nguyễn dynasty

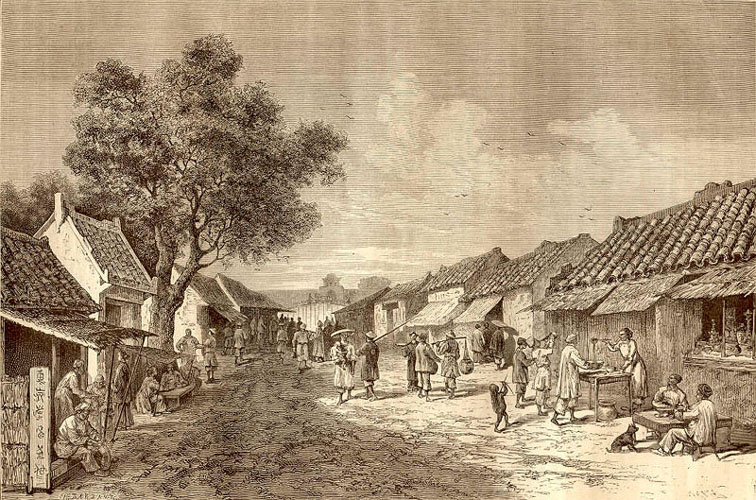
A street in Huế during the Nguyễn dynasty

== Modern architecture ==
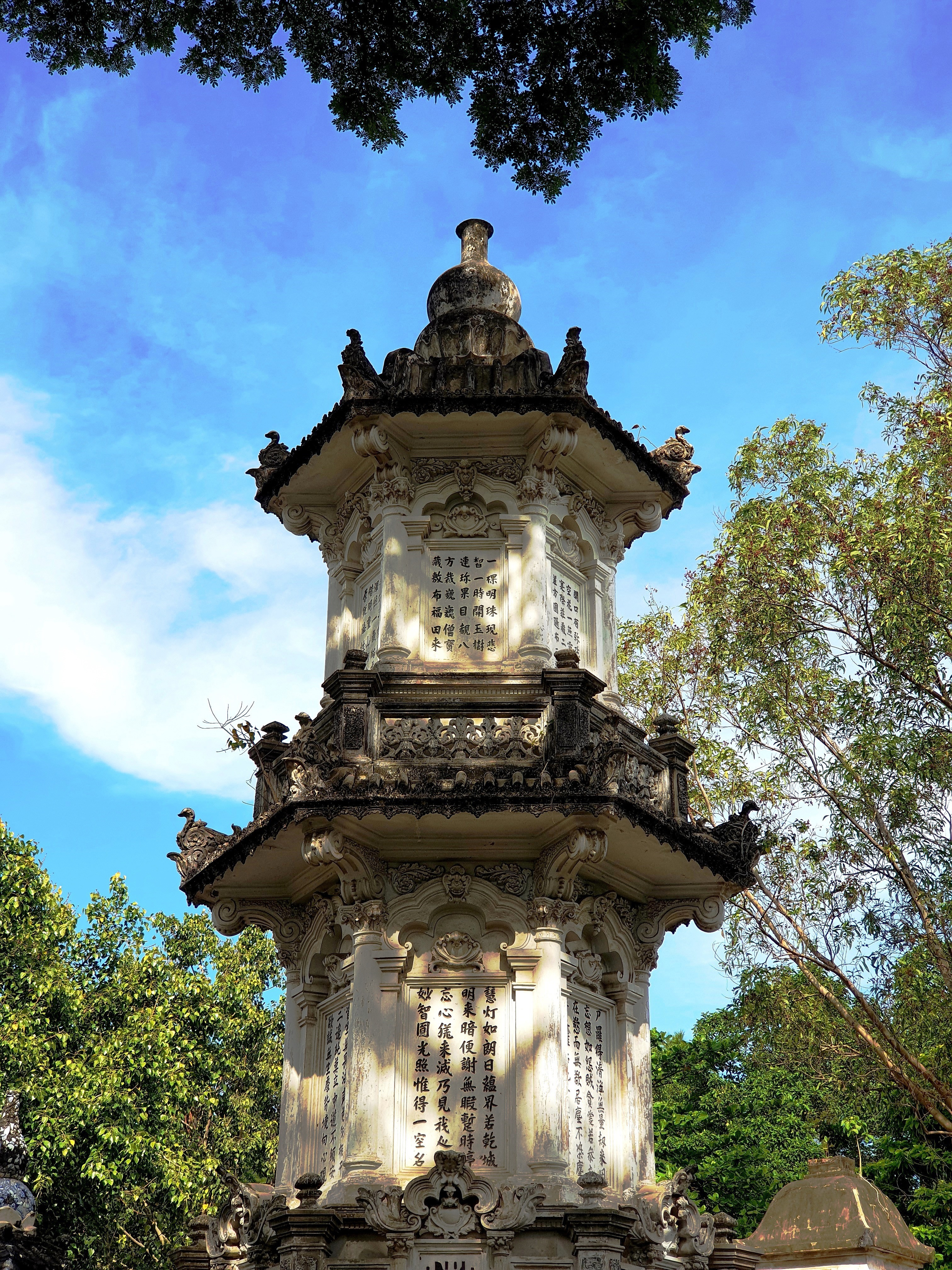
The stupa in Giác Viên Temple is an expression of the absorption and integration in Vietnamese architecture

Modern Vietnamese architecture has been influenced by the West. It has also absorbed Eastern styles and had created a unique synthesis, shaping the architectural style we see today.

- During the French colonial period: The French colonialists brought Western concepts and ideas into Vietnam. Concrete began to be widely used. The outstanding works of Western architecture in Vietnam are the Hanoi Opera House and the Notre Dame Cathedral. There are also some outstanding works of Vietnamese-French architecture including: Khải Định Tomb, Palace of An Định, Cửa Bắc Church, and the Vietnam National Museum of History.
- From 1954 to 1975 when Vietnam was divided into two by the Geneva Accords: architects in South Vietnam adapted the International Style to fit the country's culture and climate. The most famous architects include: Ngô Viết Thụ, Bùi Quang Hanh, Nguyễn Hữu Thiện, Nguyễn Quang Nhạc,...
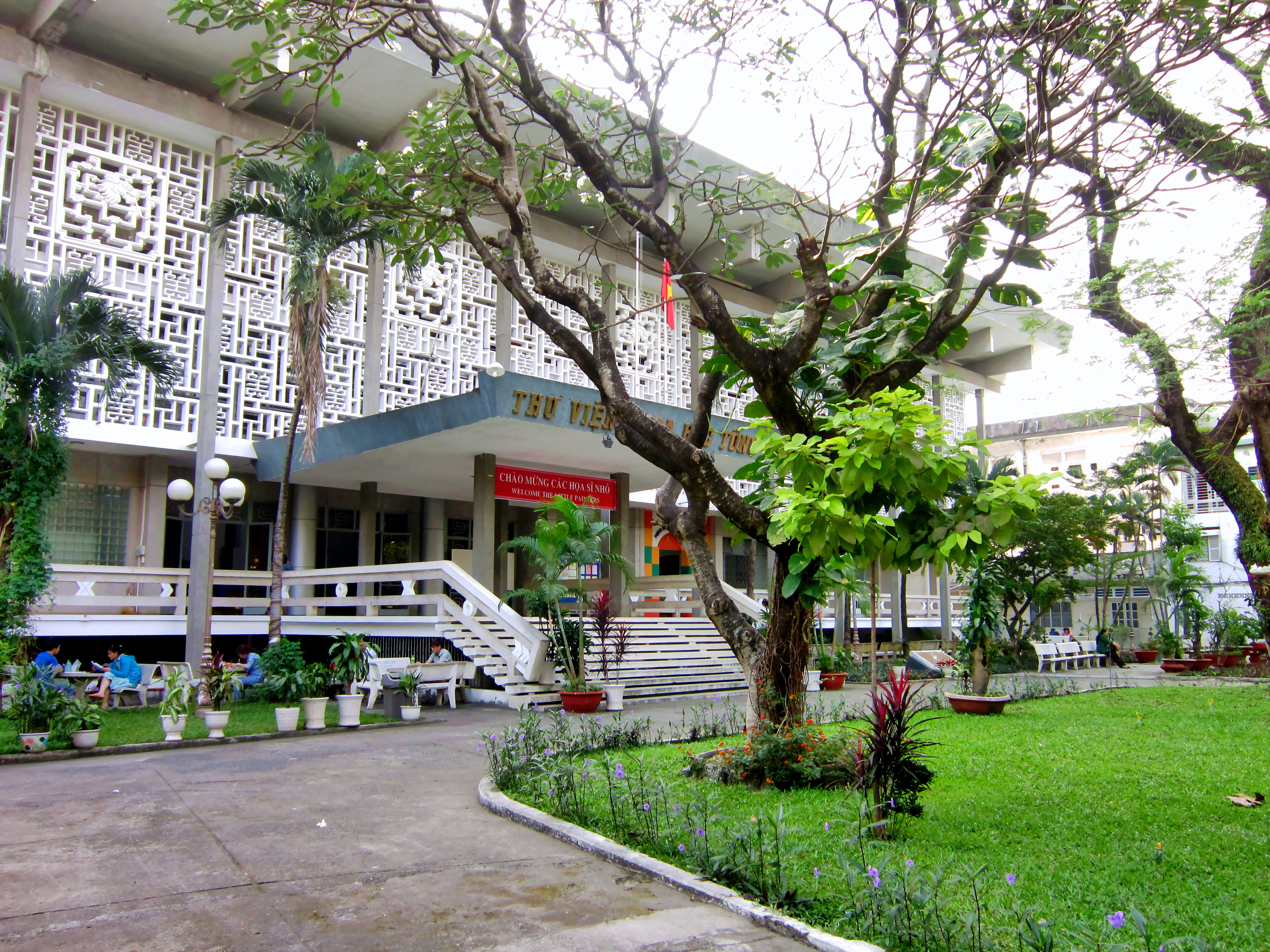
  General Sciences Library of Ho Chi Minh City designed by Bùi Quang Hanh and Nguyễn Hữu Thiện
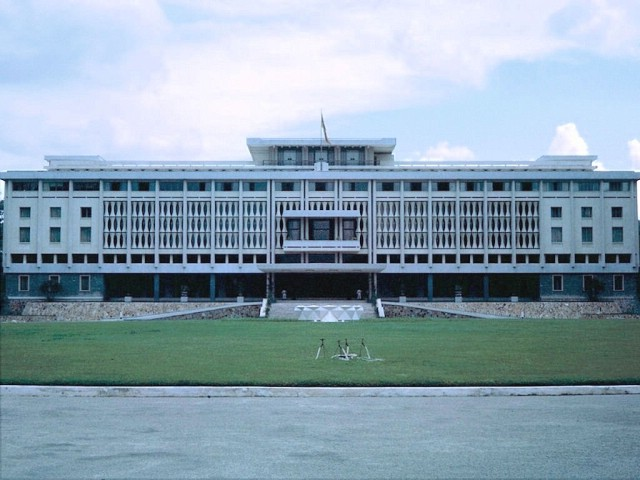
  Independence Palace designed by Ngô Viết Thụ
- From independence to present: Vietnam borrows many architectural techniques and styles from many countries around the world and creates many unique new architectural styles.

== Influences ==
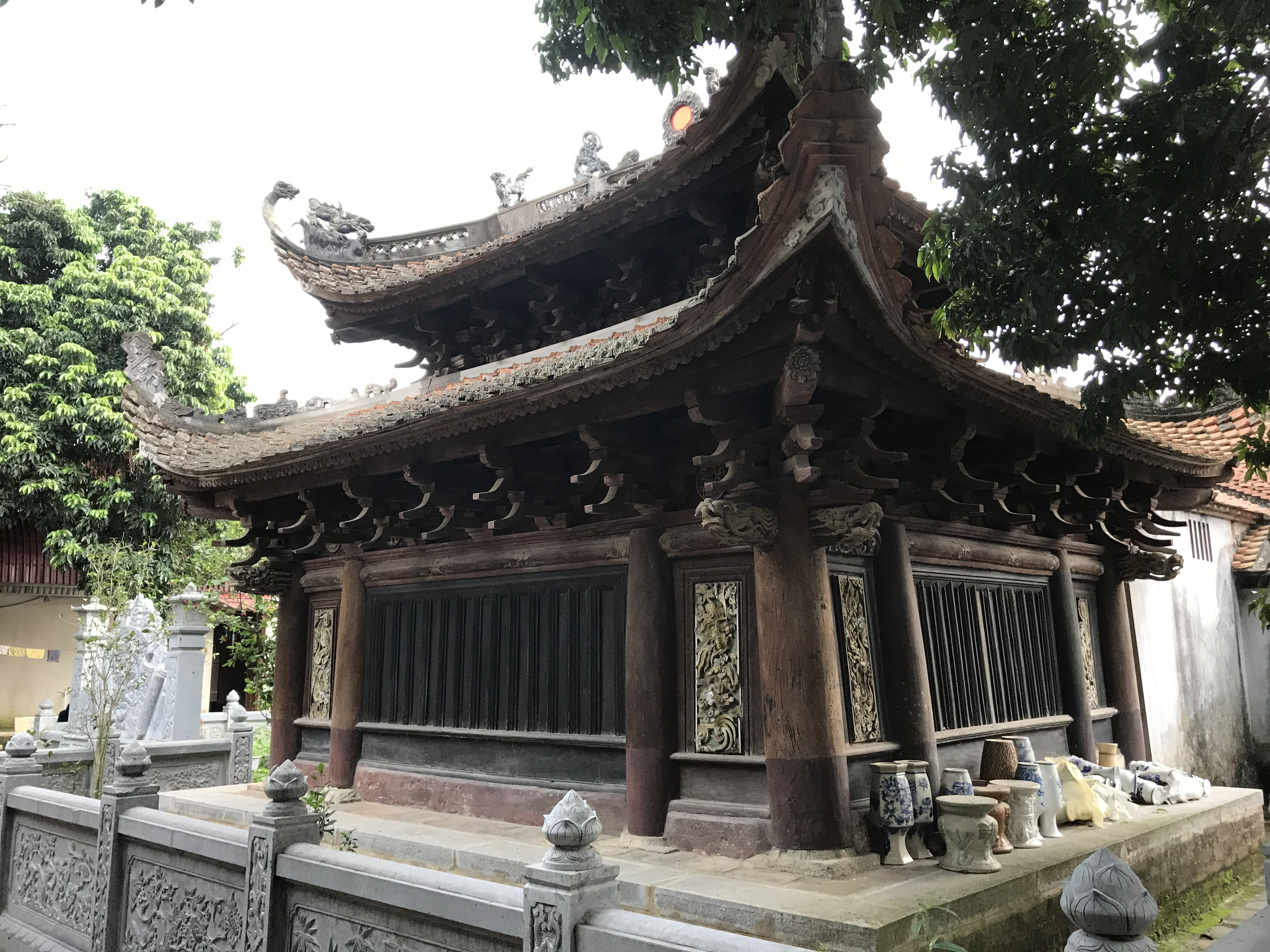
Đấu củng at Bối Khê Temple

Chinese architecture has influenced Vietnamese architecture immensely as it has the architecture of many other countries around China, including Japan and Korea. Vietnamese architecture differs from Chinese architecture in several ways. The dougong (Chinese: 斗拱; pinyin: dǒugǒng; lit. cap [and] block; Vietnamese: Đấu củng) is an important part of Chinese architecture, and is rarely found or not at all in Vietnamese architecture starting from the Lê dynasty where Vietnamese architecture began to develop and innovate away from Chinese traditional architecture. Vietnamese architecture was also influenced by feng shui (Vietnamese: phong thủy): buildings were orientated according to the directions and stars. A good example of this was during the construction of the Imperial City of Huế. Geomancers were consulted to find a suitable location for the citadel which was oriented to face the Hương River (Perfume River) to the southeast. This differs from Beijing's Forbidden City which faces true south.

French architecture has also influenced Vietnamese architecture. Many colonial buildings blend Vietnamese and French styles. The imperial palace of Huế, has many buildings using French architectural techniques and styles.

== Gallery ==
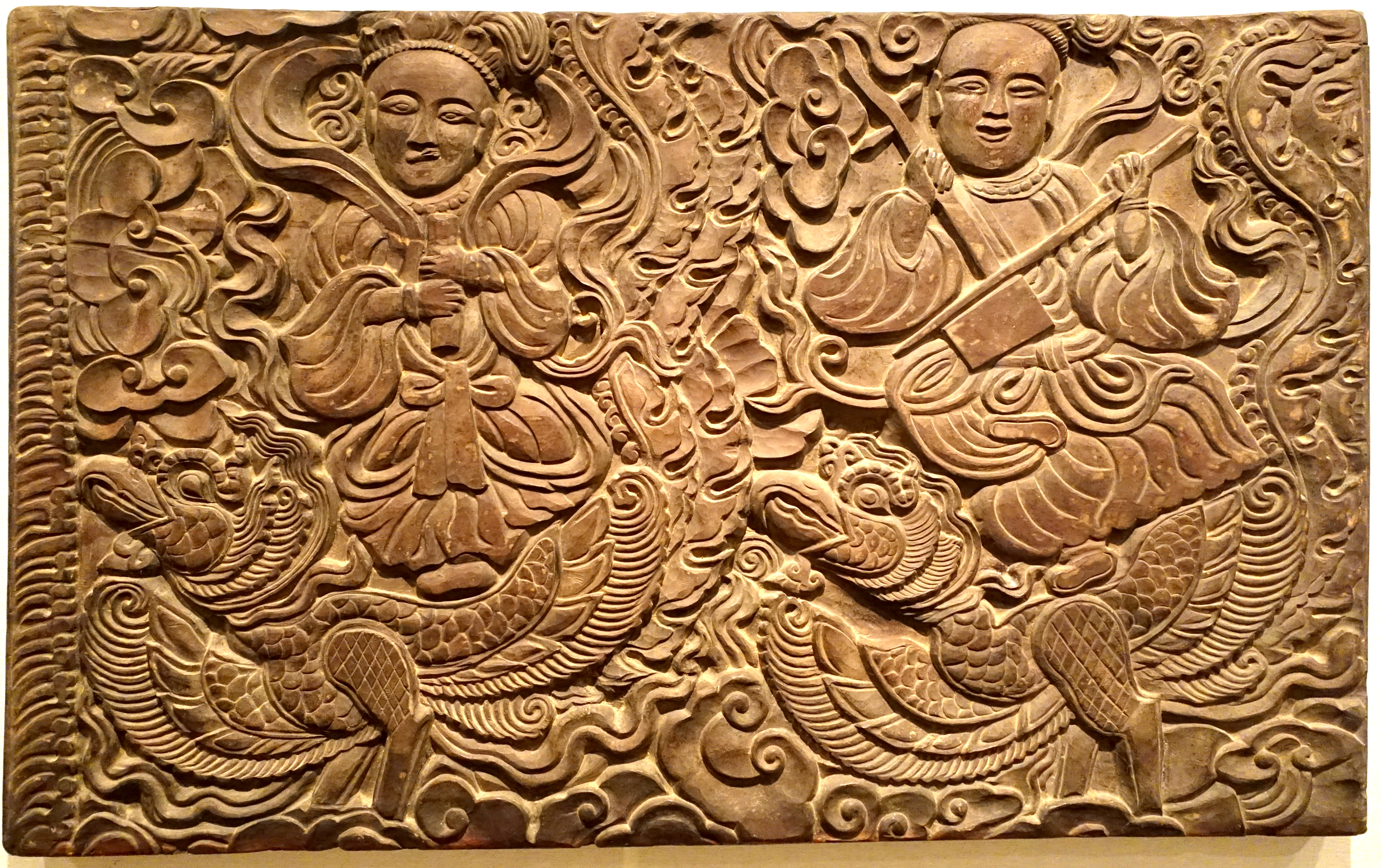
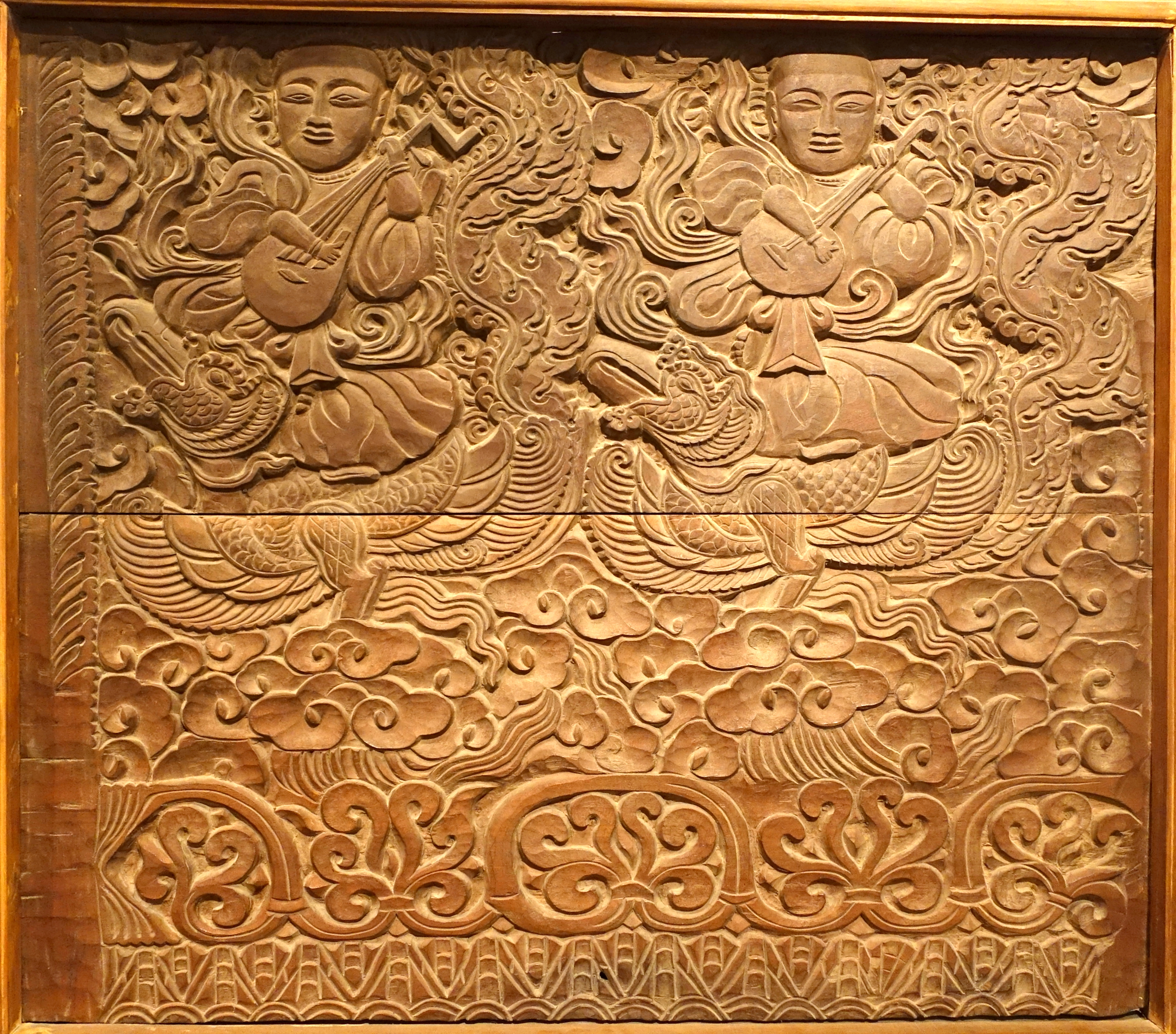
Vietnamese wood carving typically found on the walls of old temples, a distinct feature of Vietnamese architecture
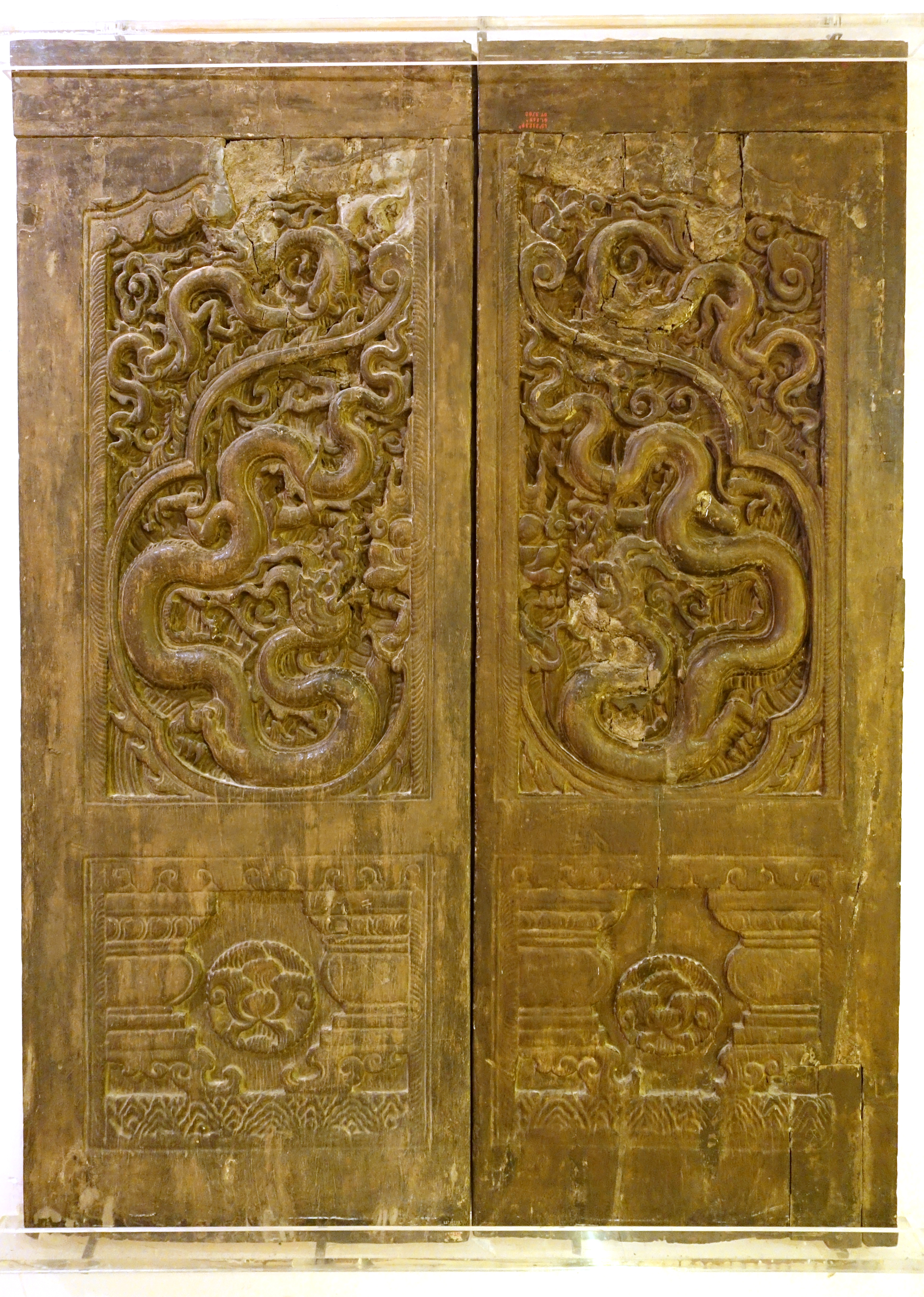
Vietnamese wood carving on one of the doors of the Phổ Minh pagoda

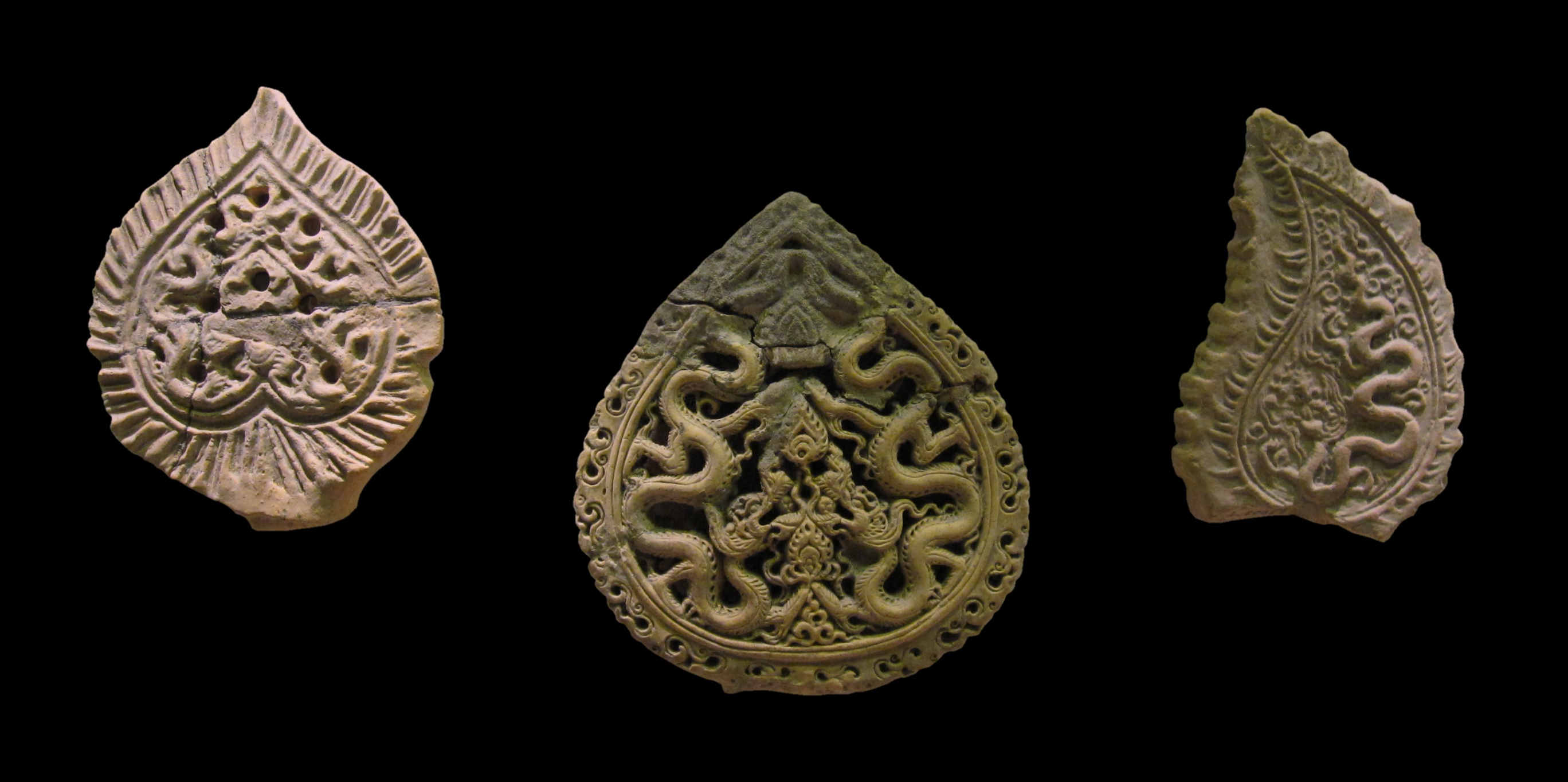
Vietnamese terracotta of dragons during the Lý–Trần dynasties, 11th–14th century. Used to decorate Vietnamese architecture

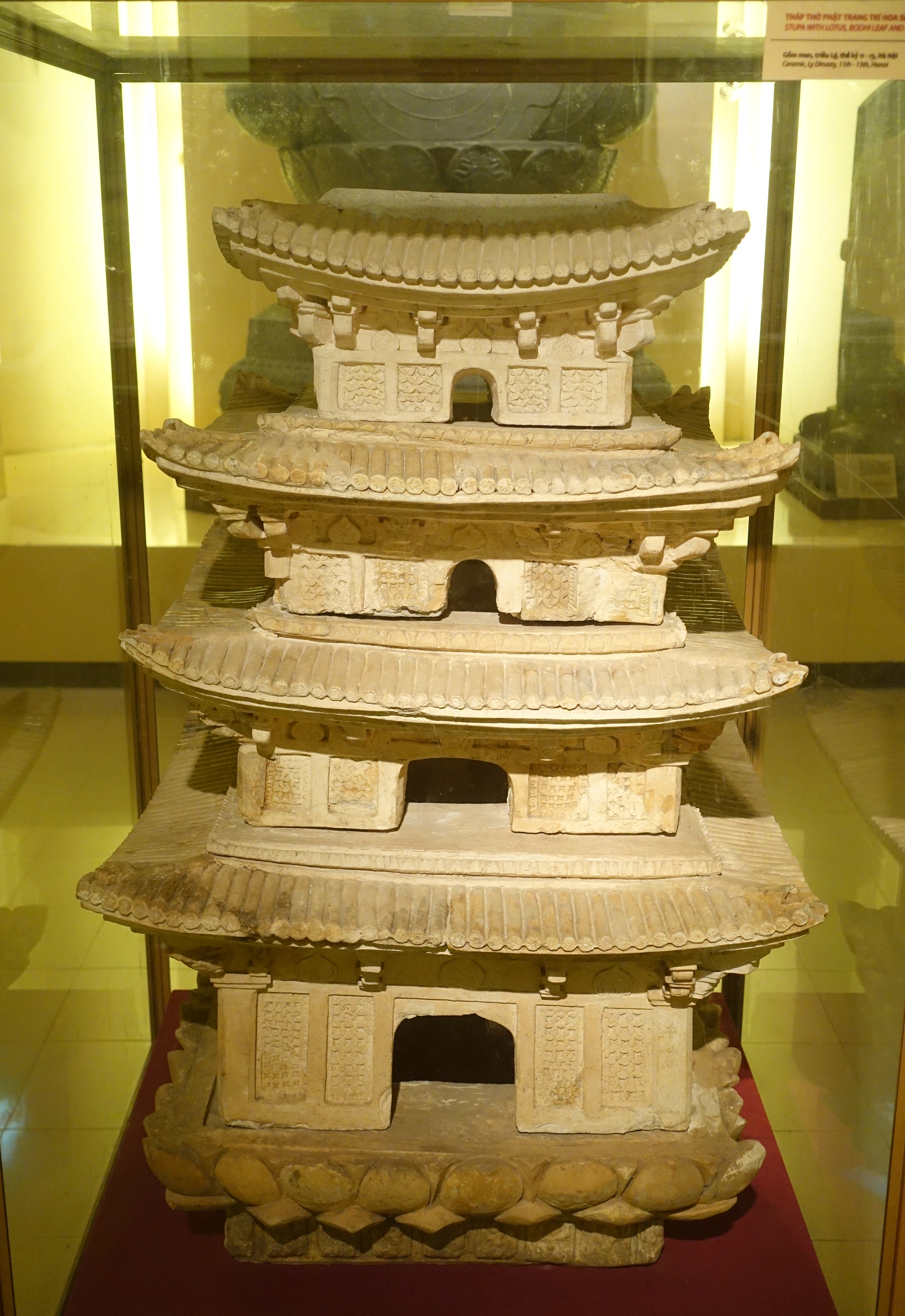
Stupa with lotus, bodhi leaf and dancer decoration, Hanoi, Lý dynasty, 11th–13th century AD, ceramic – National Museum of Vietnamese History – Hanoi, Vietnam

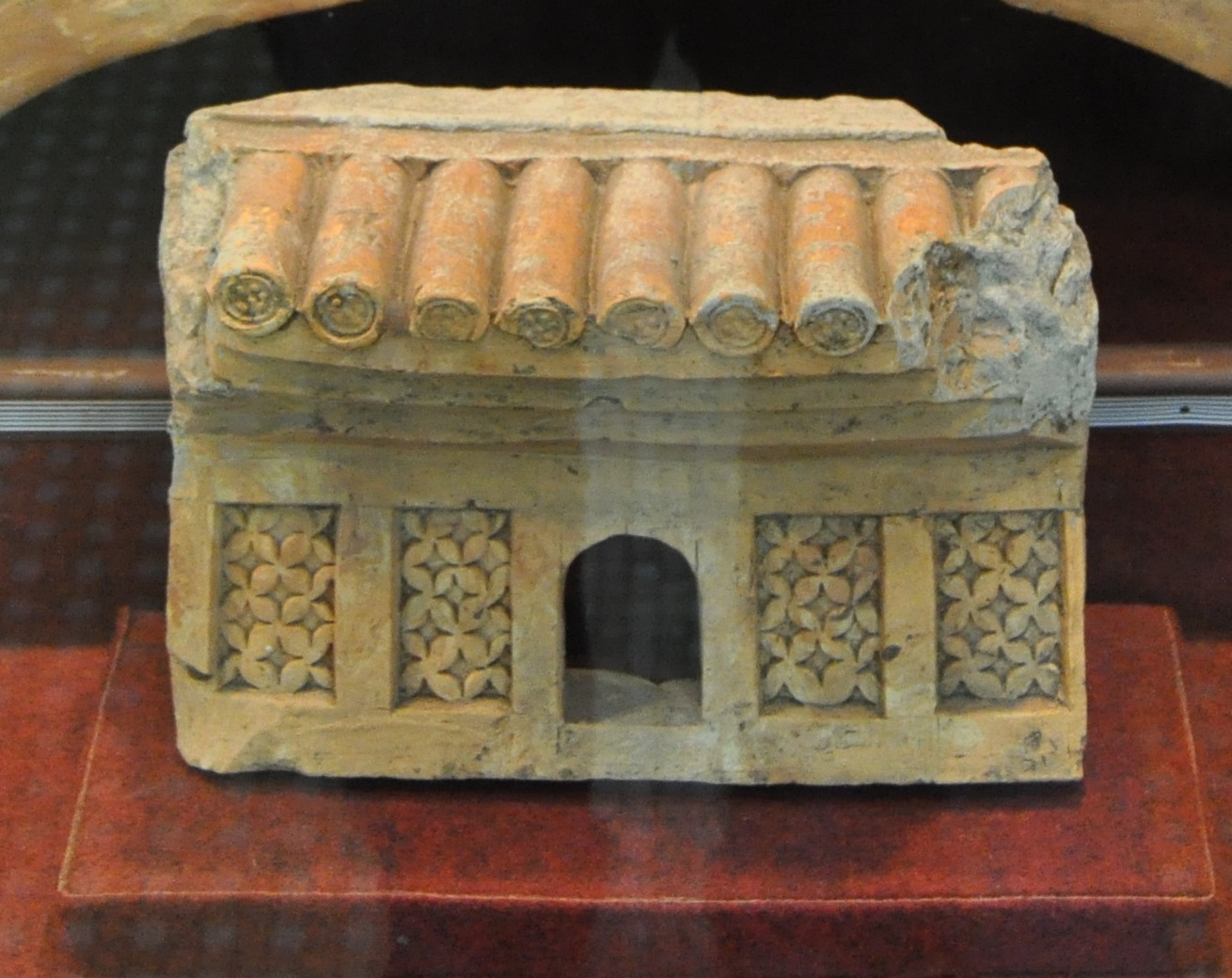
Porch, terra cotta, late 11th – early 12th century architectural material of the Lý dynasty

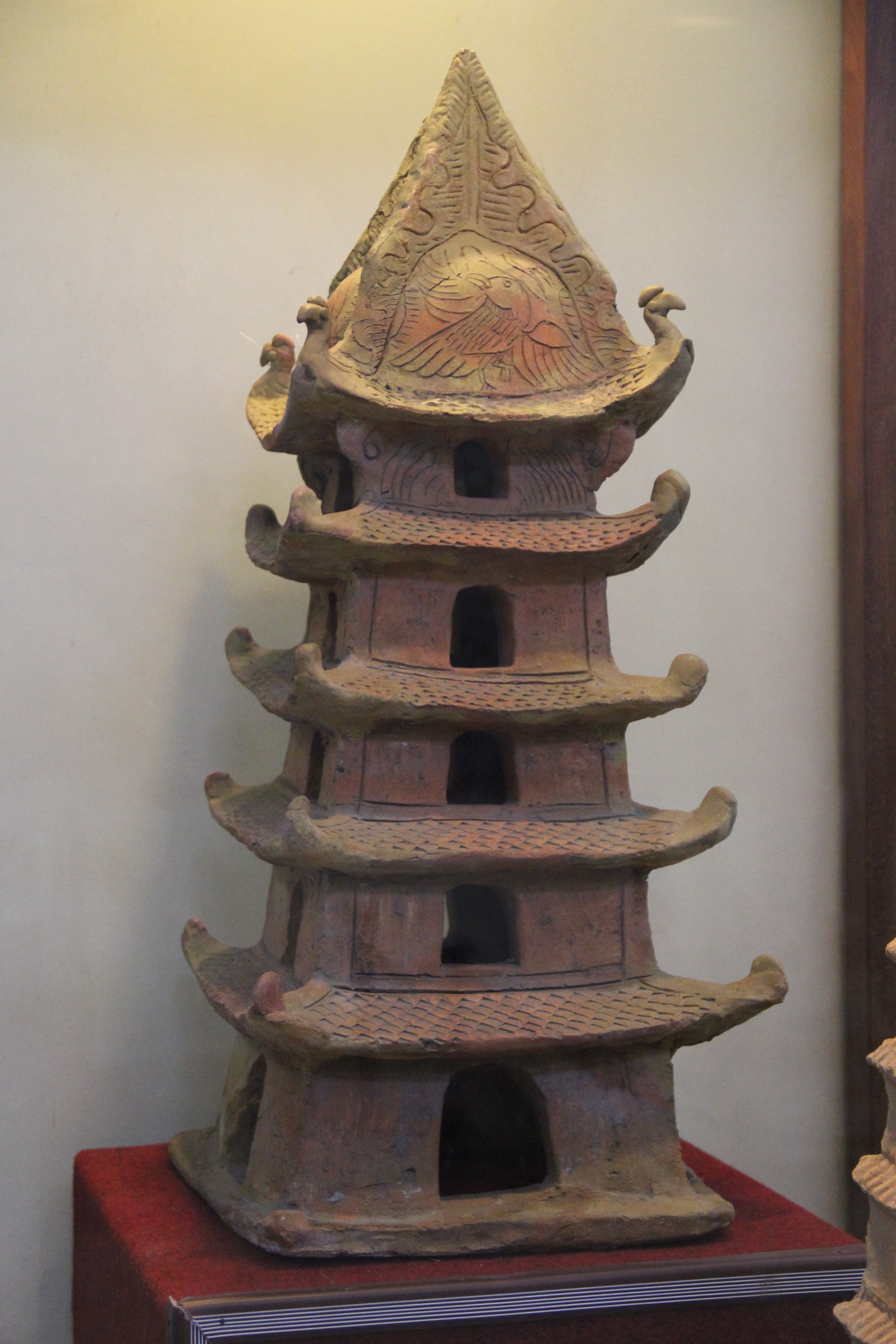
Trần dynasty ceramic pagoda

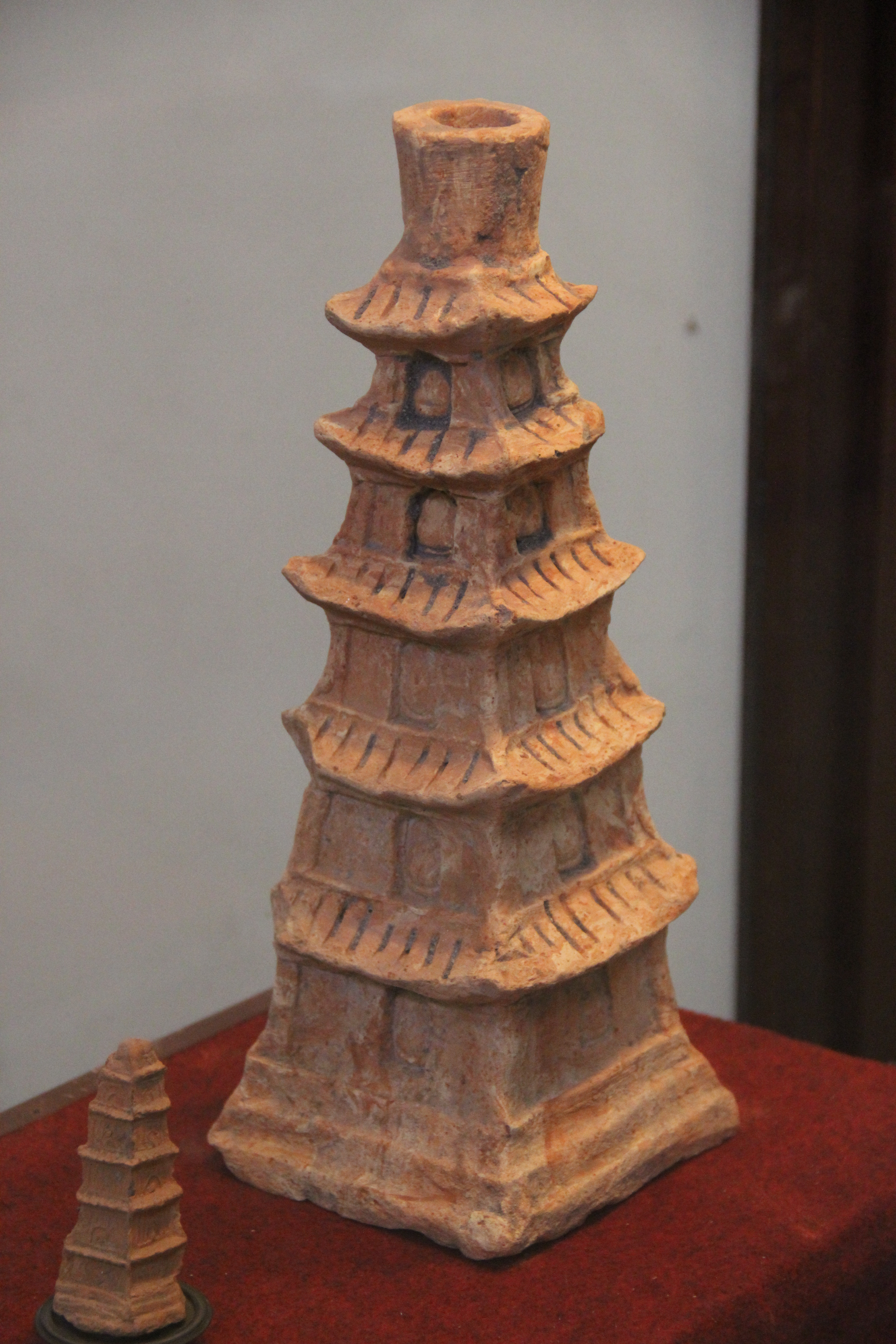
Trần dynasty ceramic pagoda

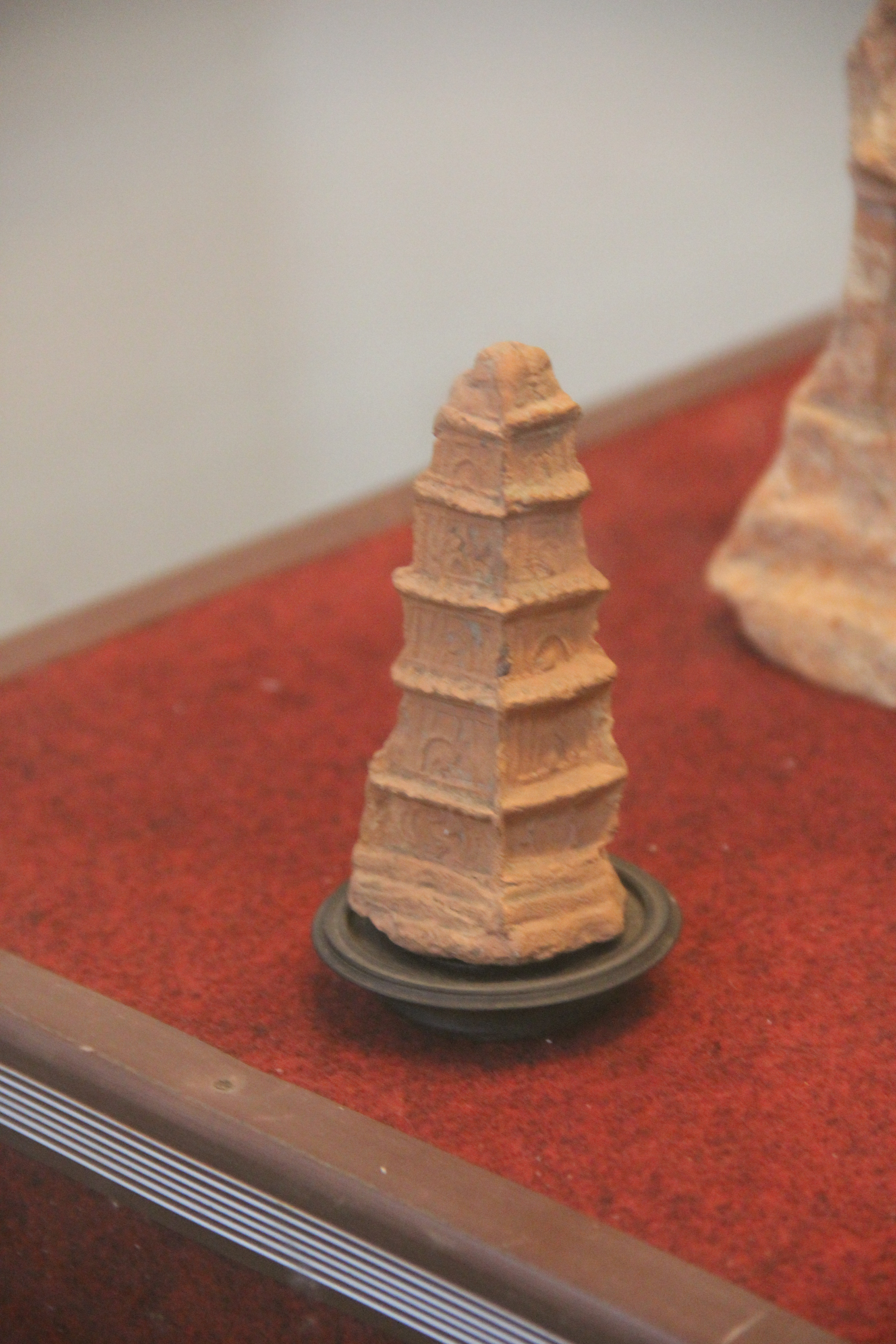
Trần dynasty ceramic pagoda

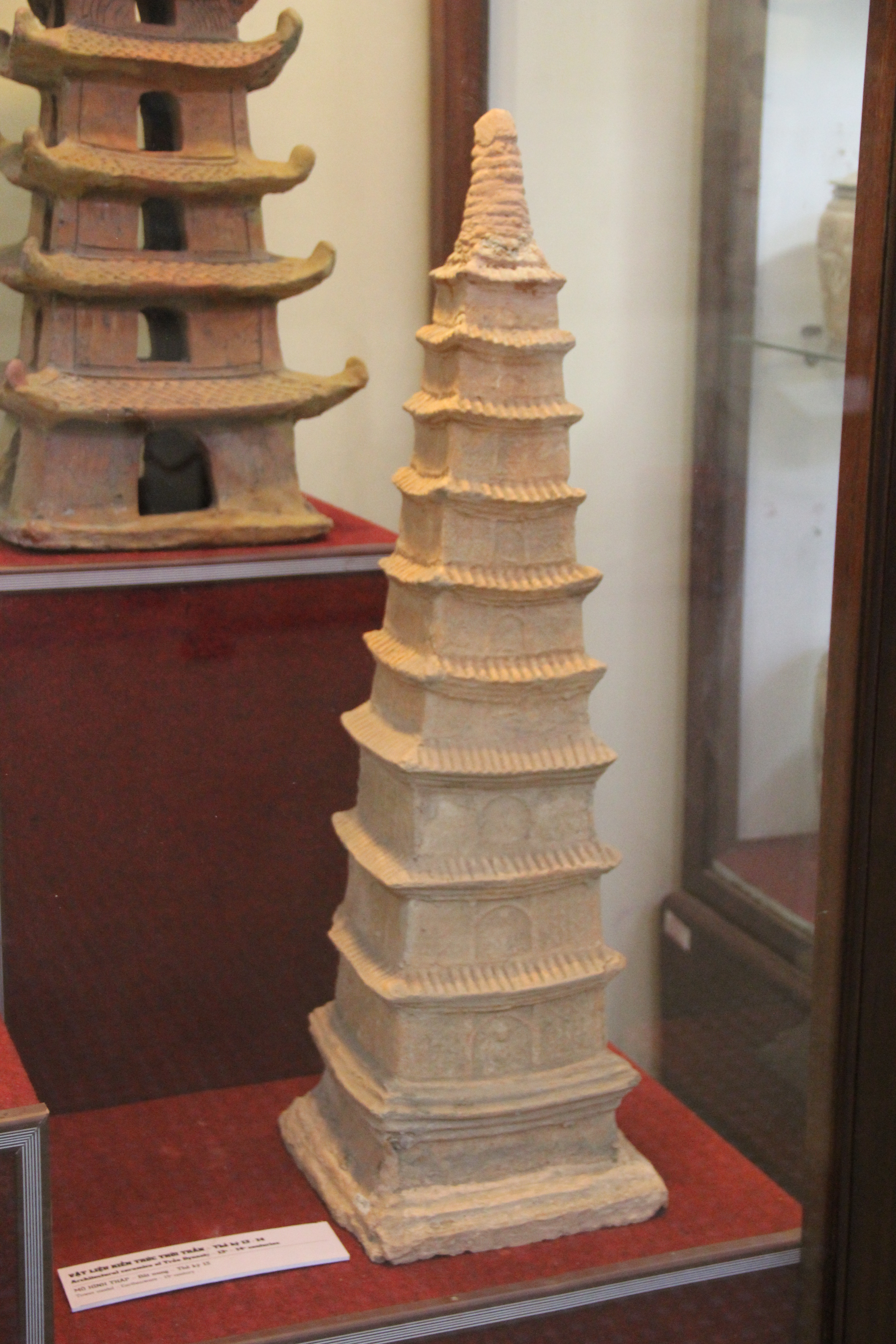
Trần dynasty ceramic pagoda

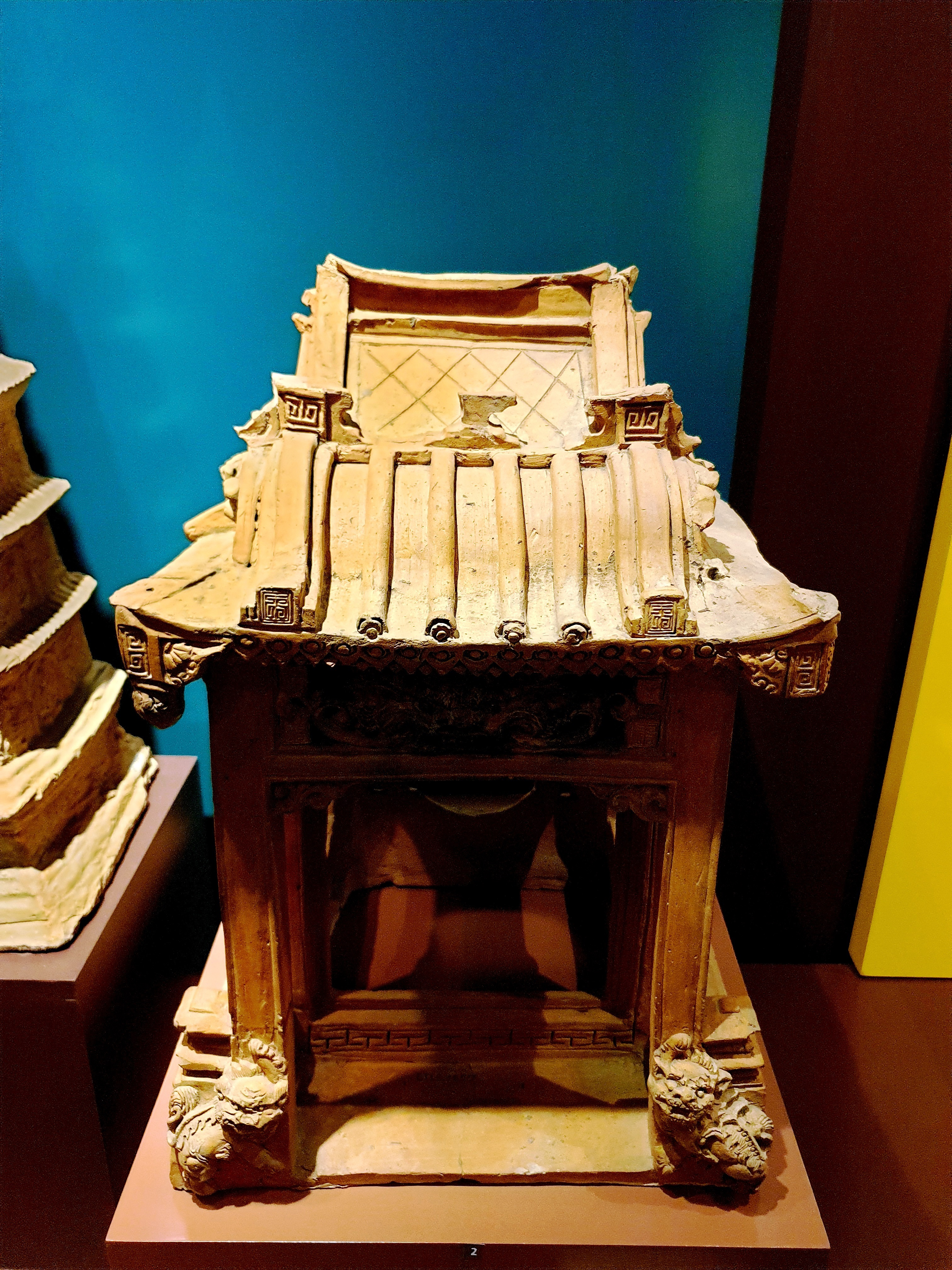
Collections of the Museum of Vietnamese History from the Trần dynasty

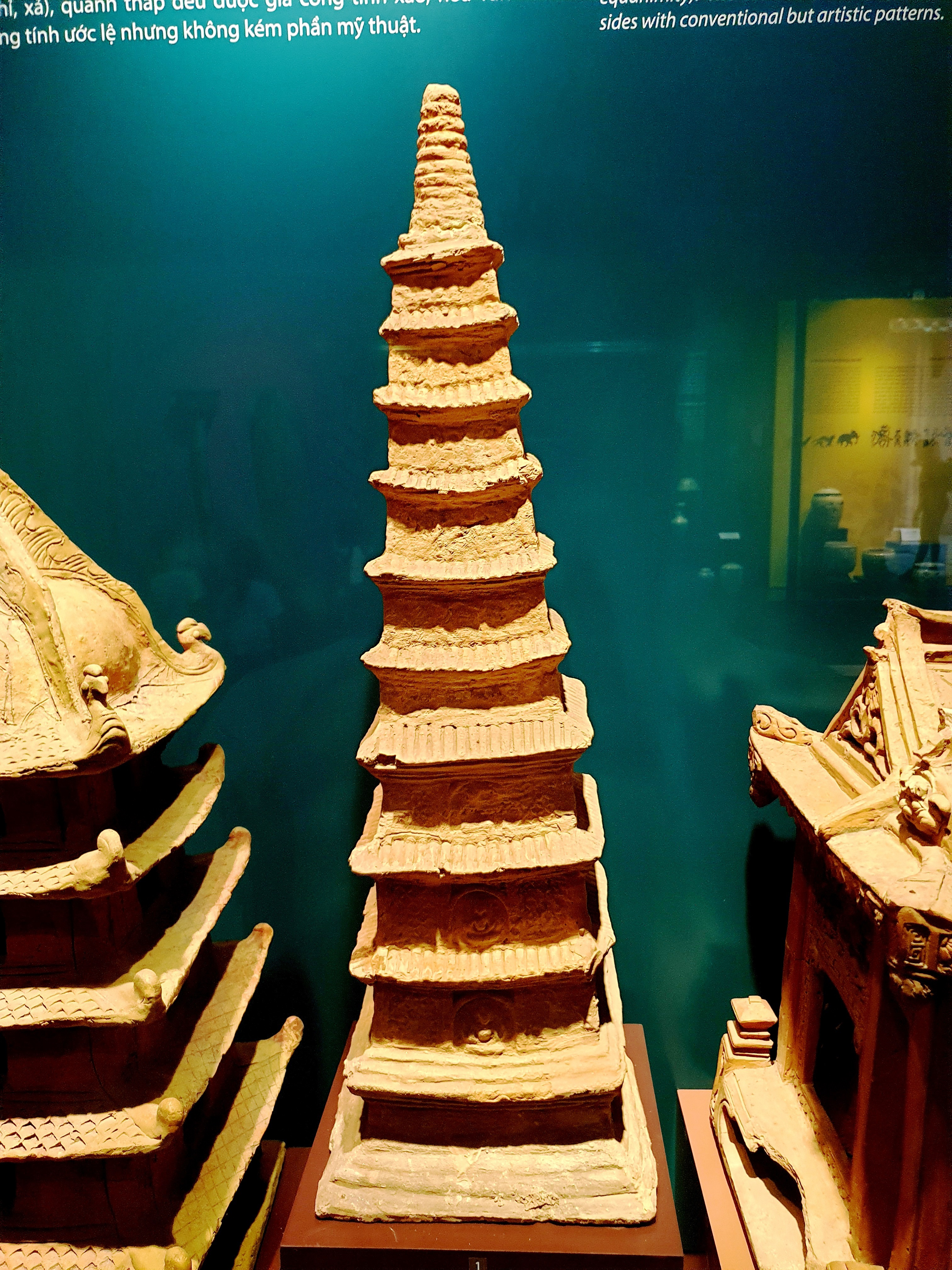
Collections of the Museum of Vietnamese History from the Trần dynasty

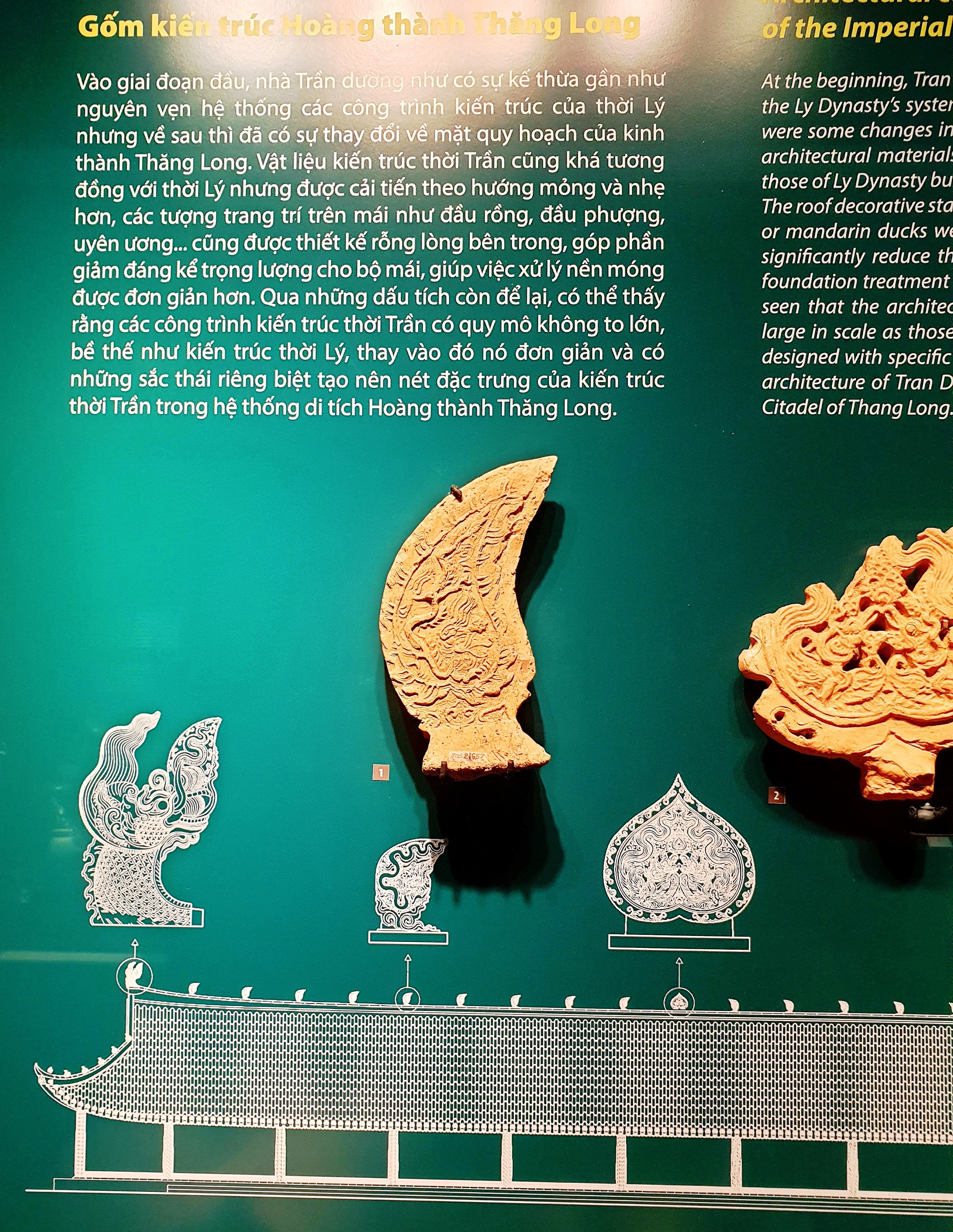
Decoration on the roof of the Trần dynasty

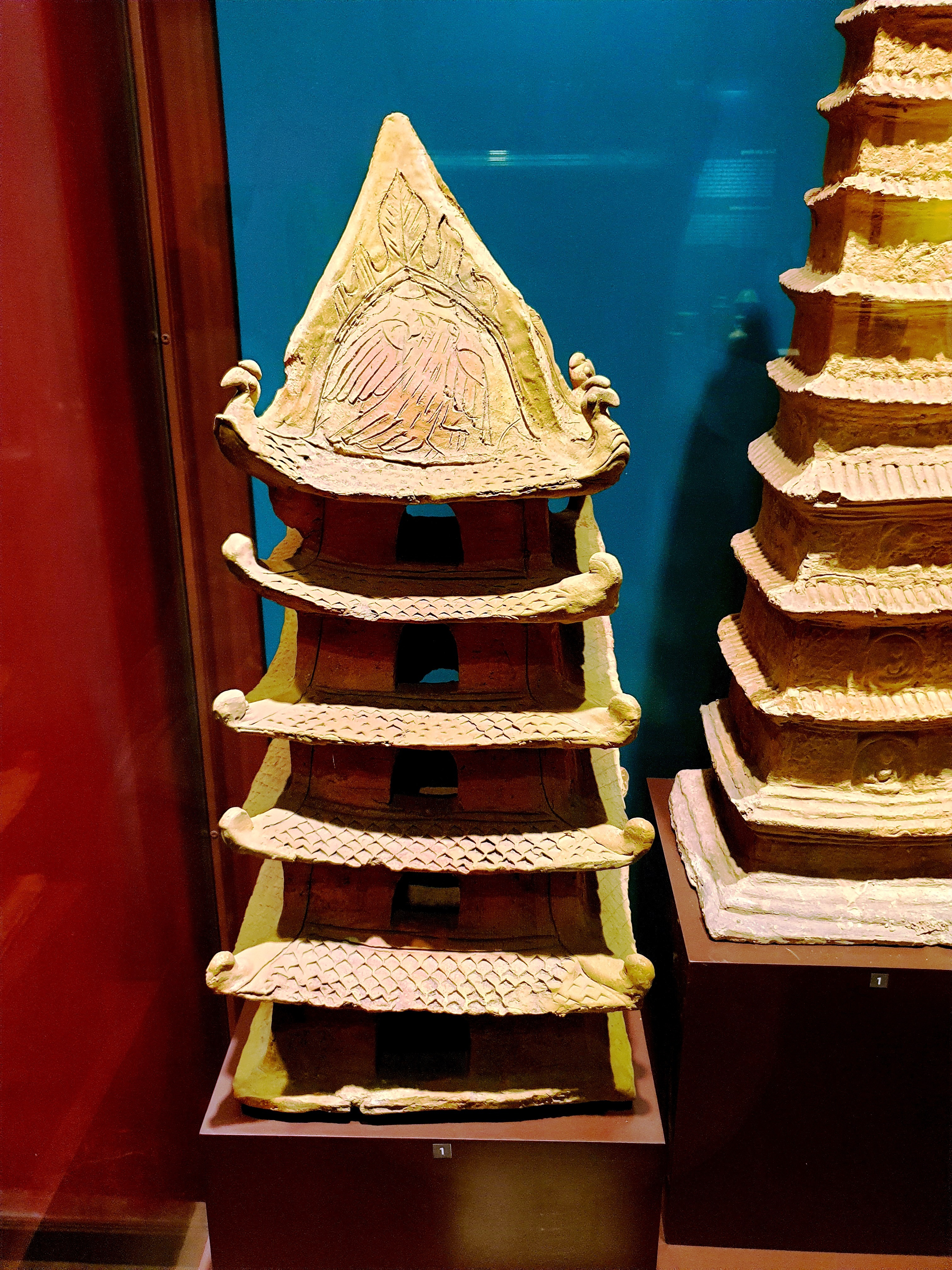
Collections of the Museum of Vietnamese History from the Trần dynasty

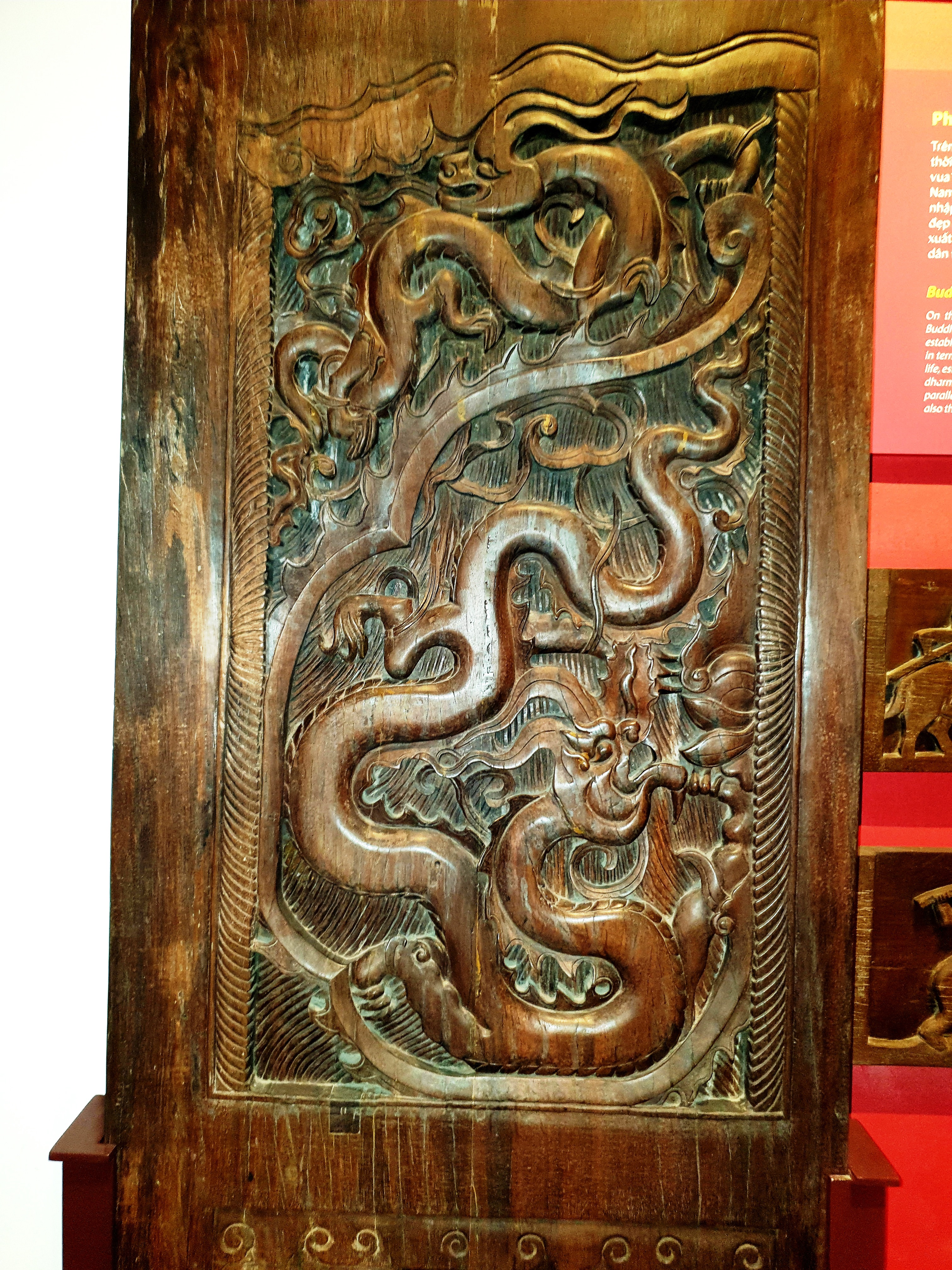
Dragon carving door from the Trần dynasty

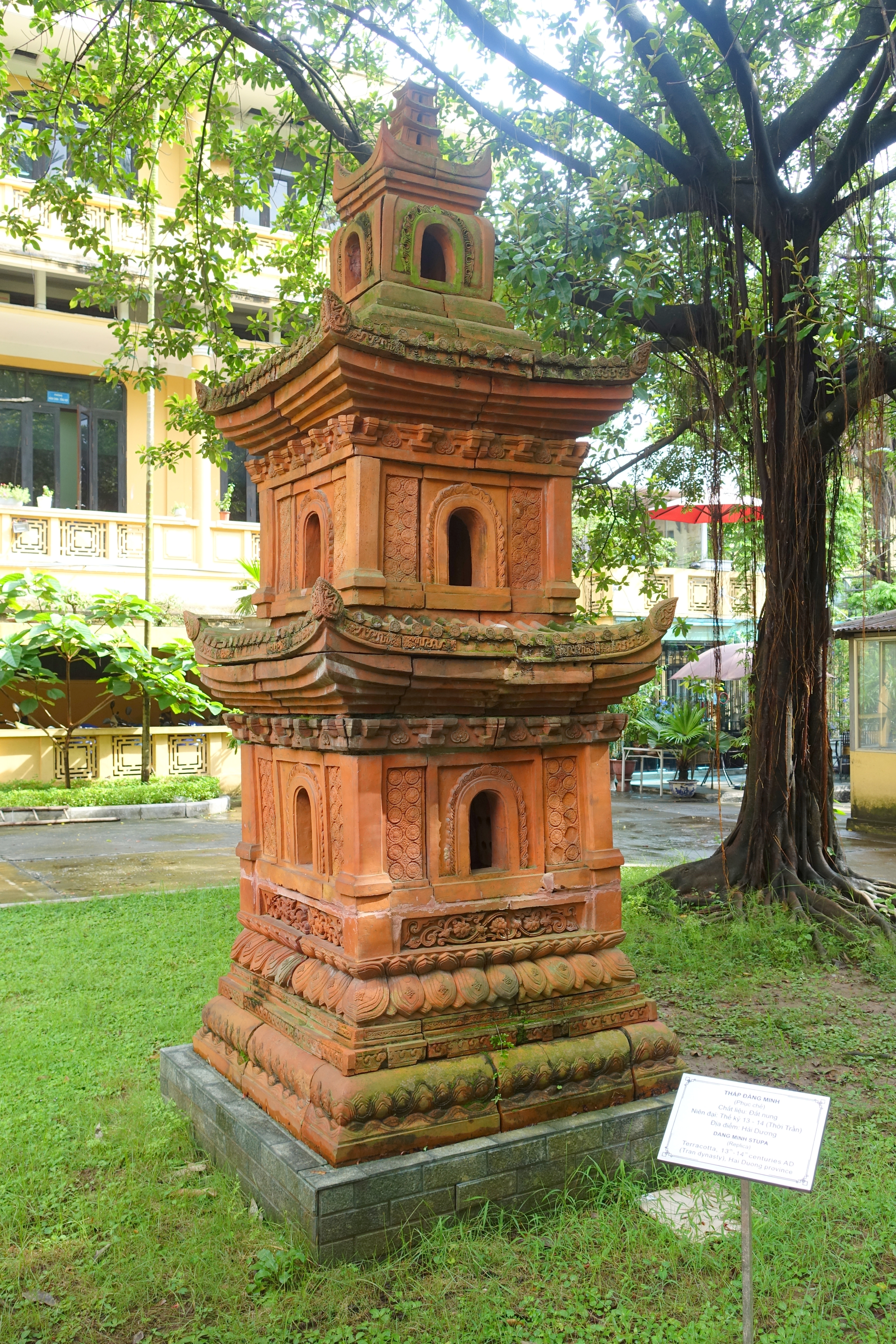
Dang Minh stupa (replica), Hai Duong province, Tran dynasty, 13th–14th century AD

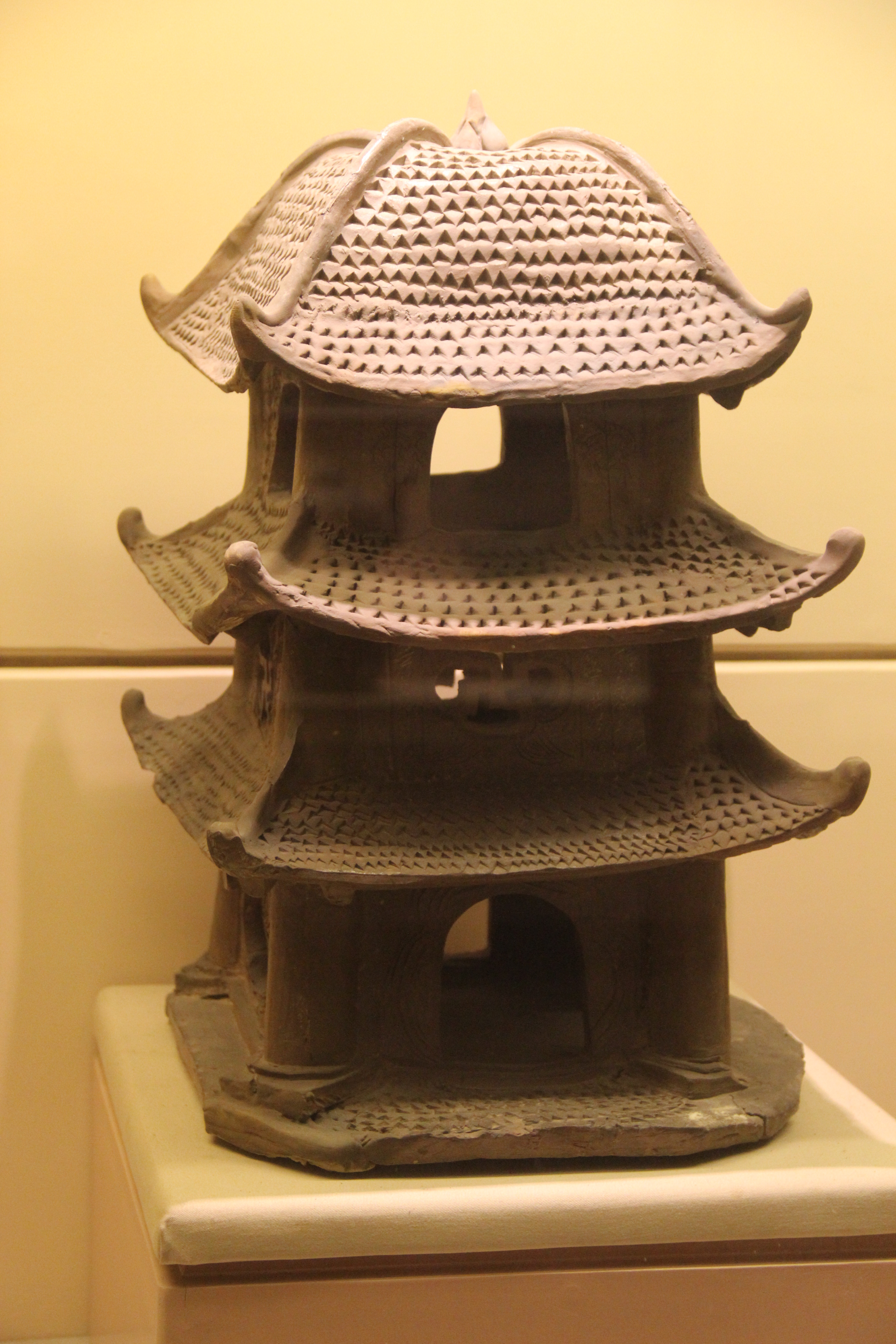
Restored Lê–Nguyễn dynasty, 17th–19th century

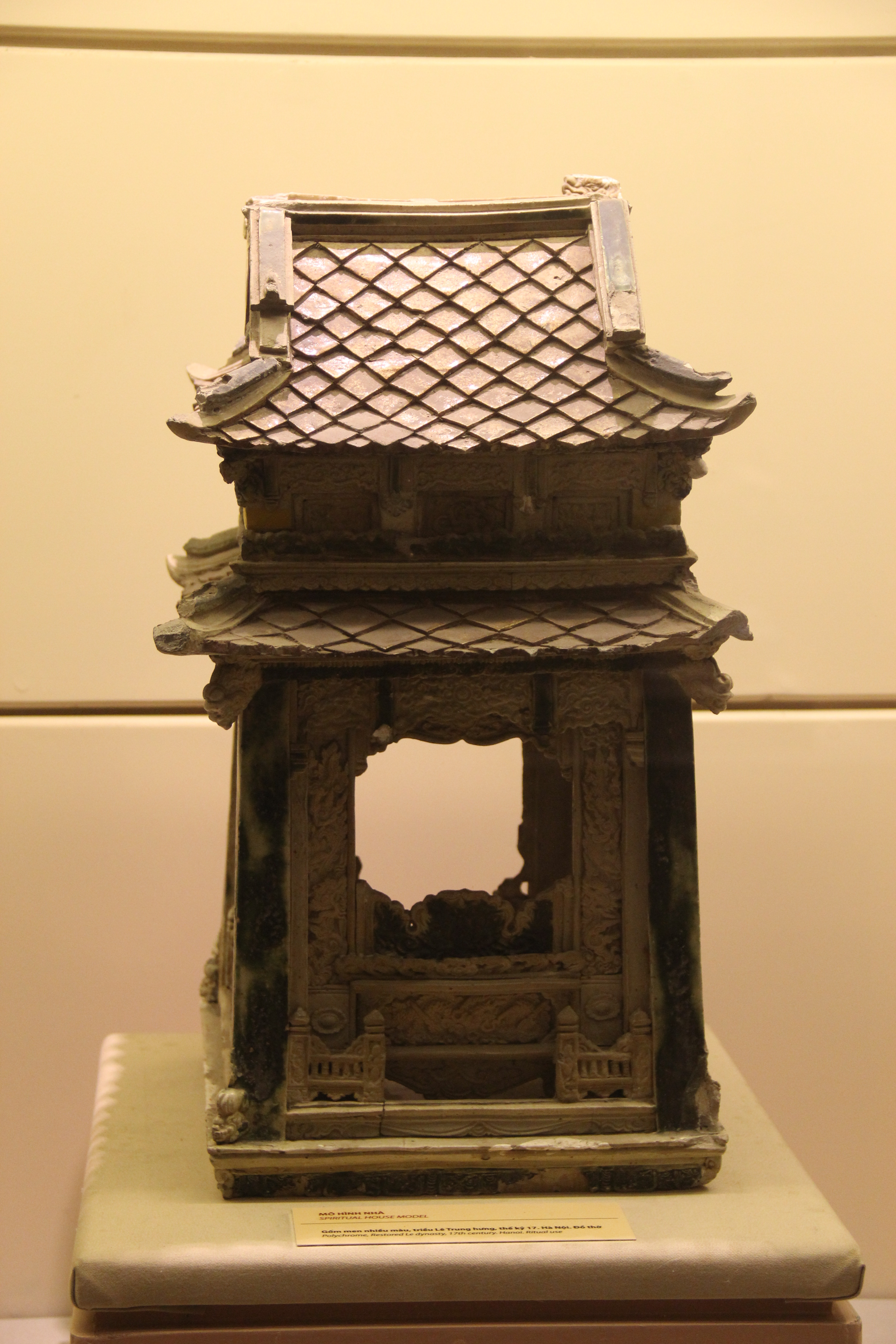
Lê dynasty ceramic spiritual house model, 17th century

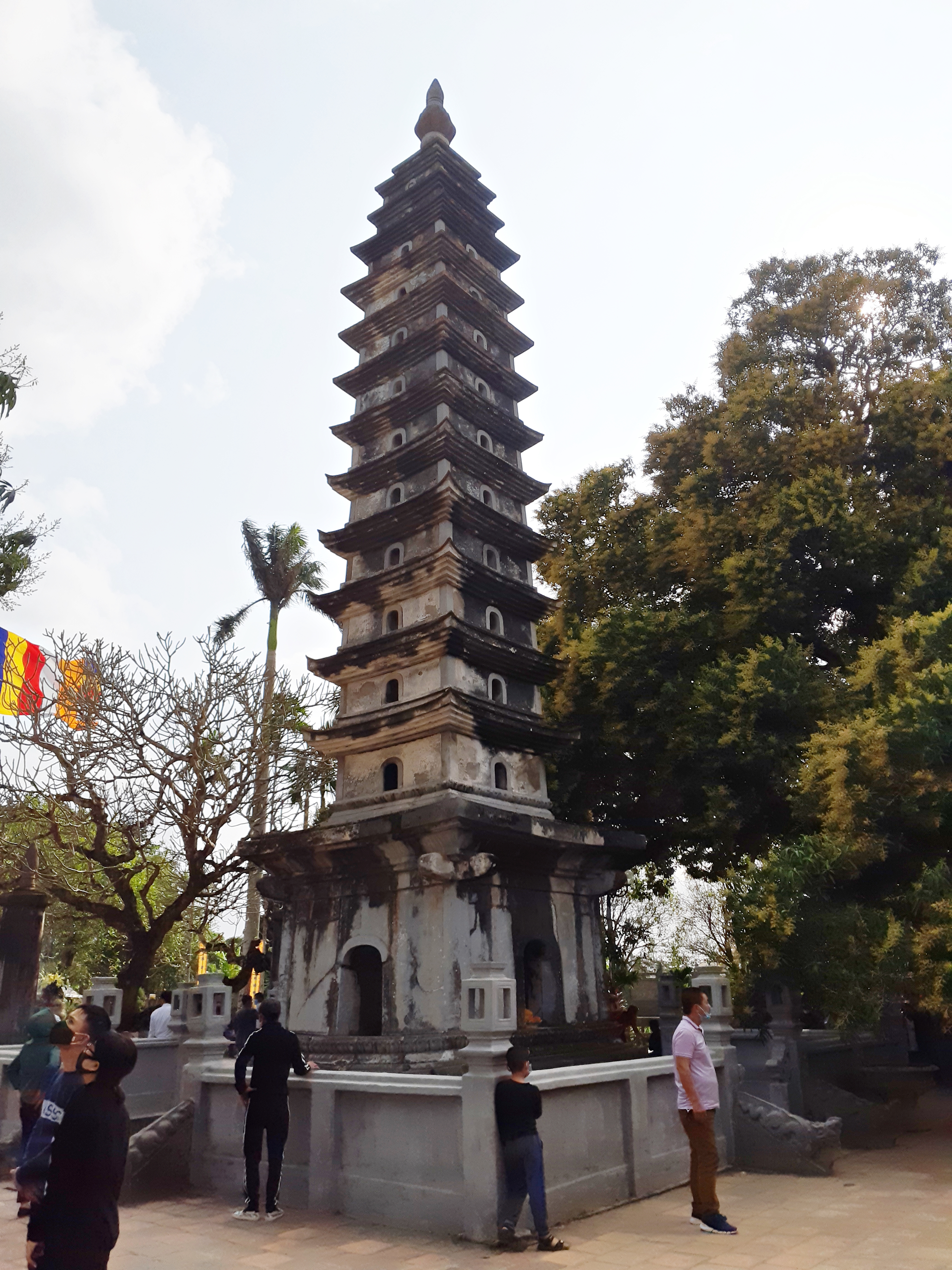
Phổ Minh Pagoda, Phổ Minh Temple, constructed during the Trần dynasty

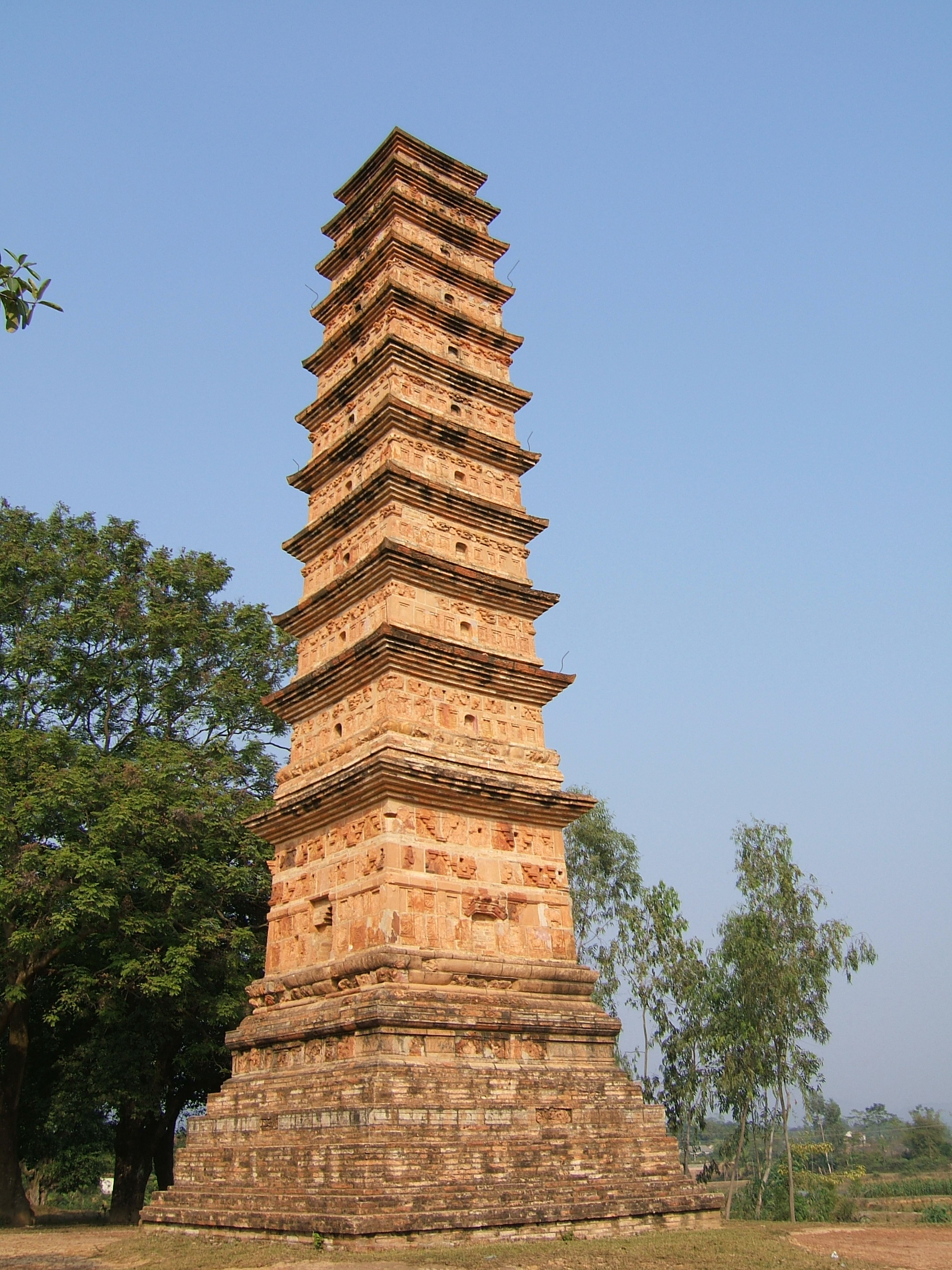
Bình Sơn Pagoda in Vĩnh Khánh Temple, constructed during the Trần dynasty

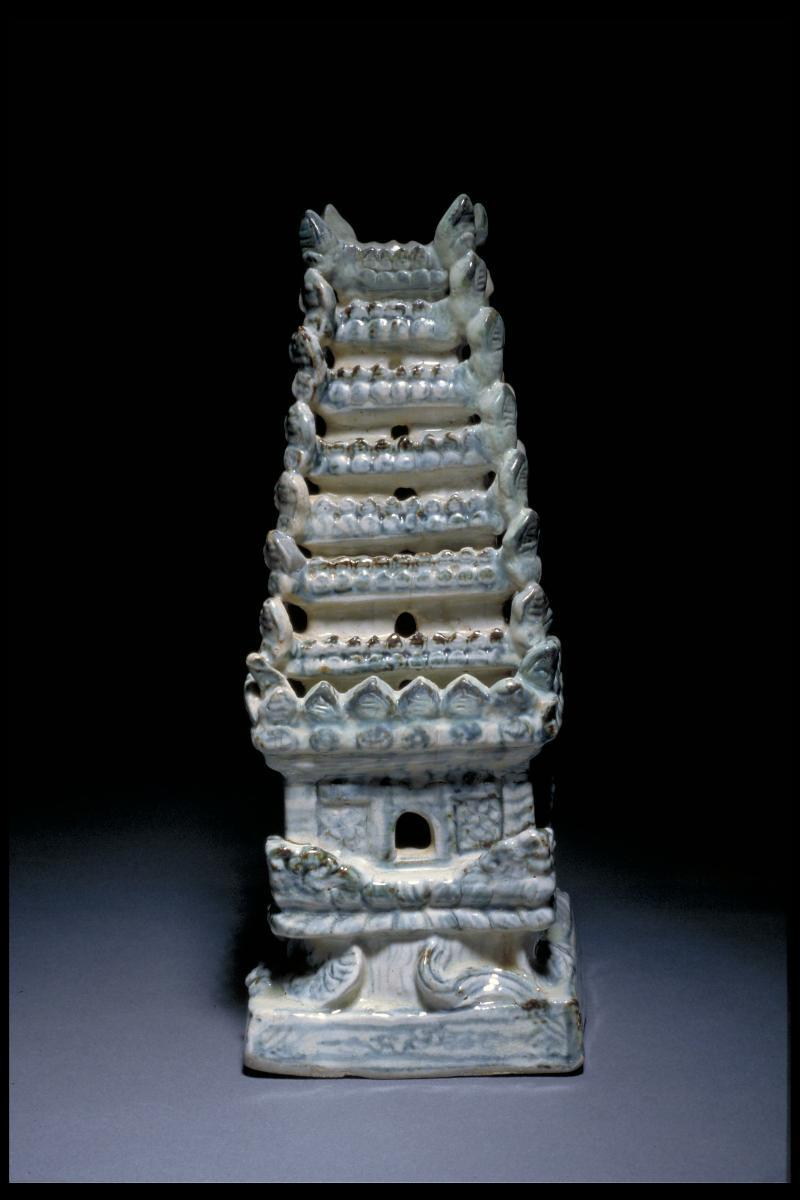
14th–16th century miniature shrine

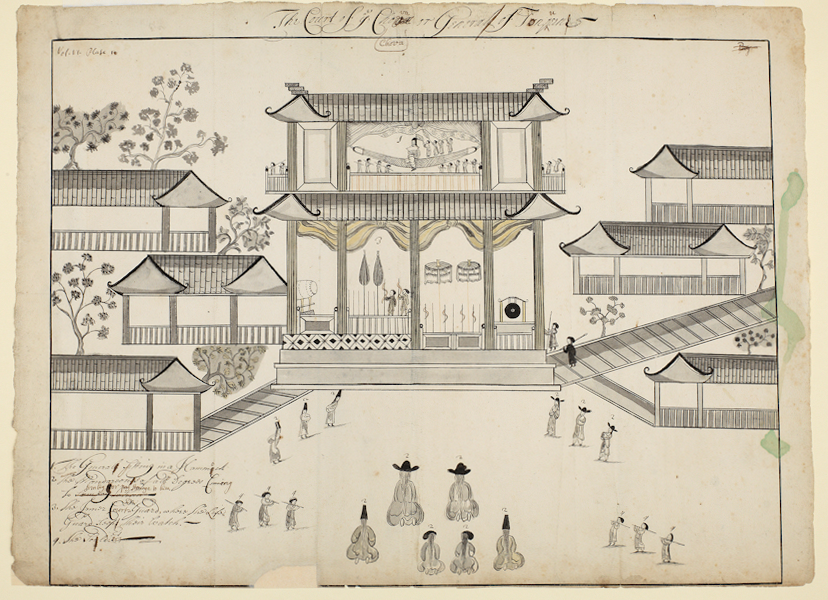
Painting a corner of the Trịnh lord's palace in Đông Kinh

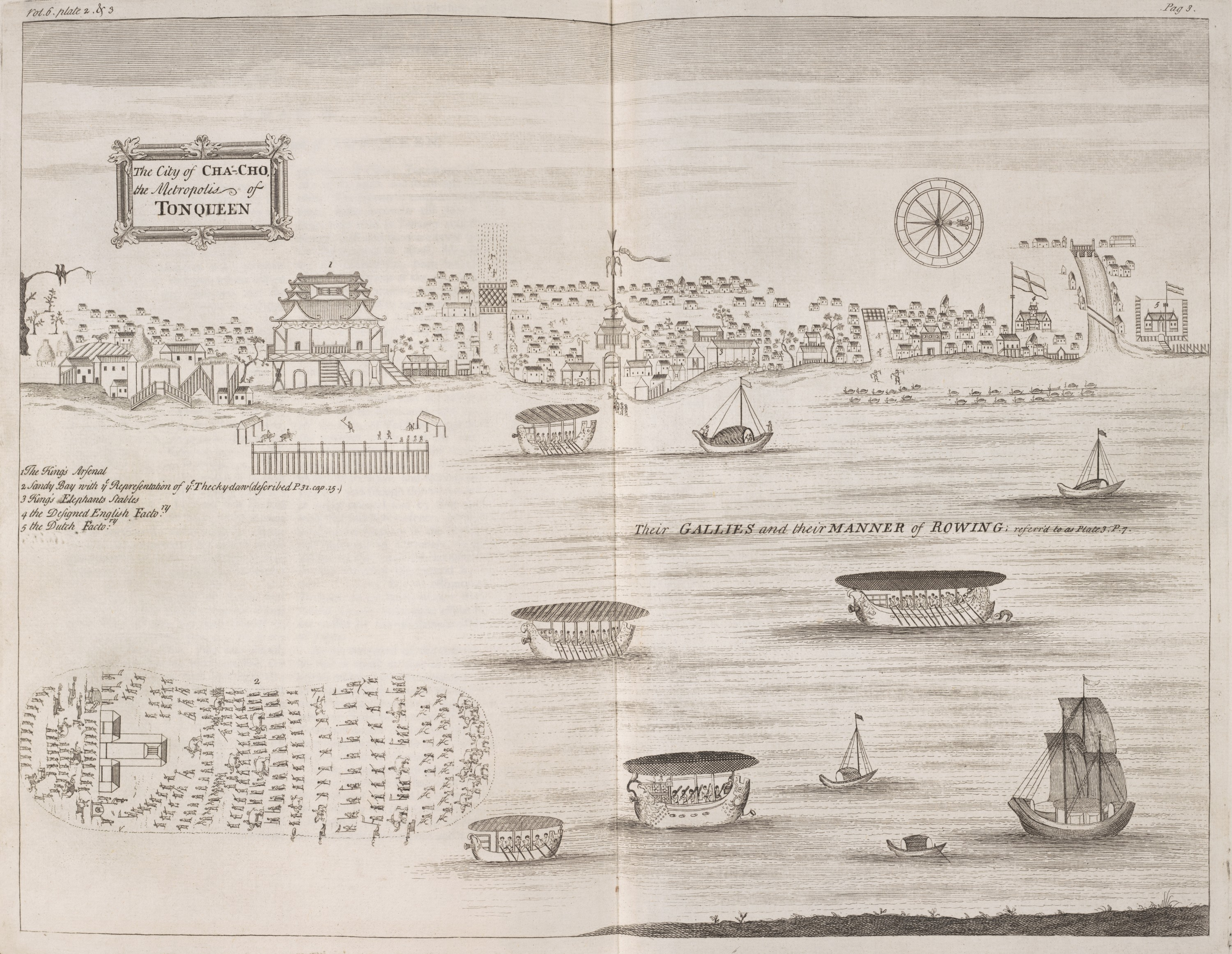
Lord Trịnh's Ngũ Long Lầu (the largest building in the picture)

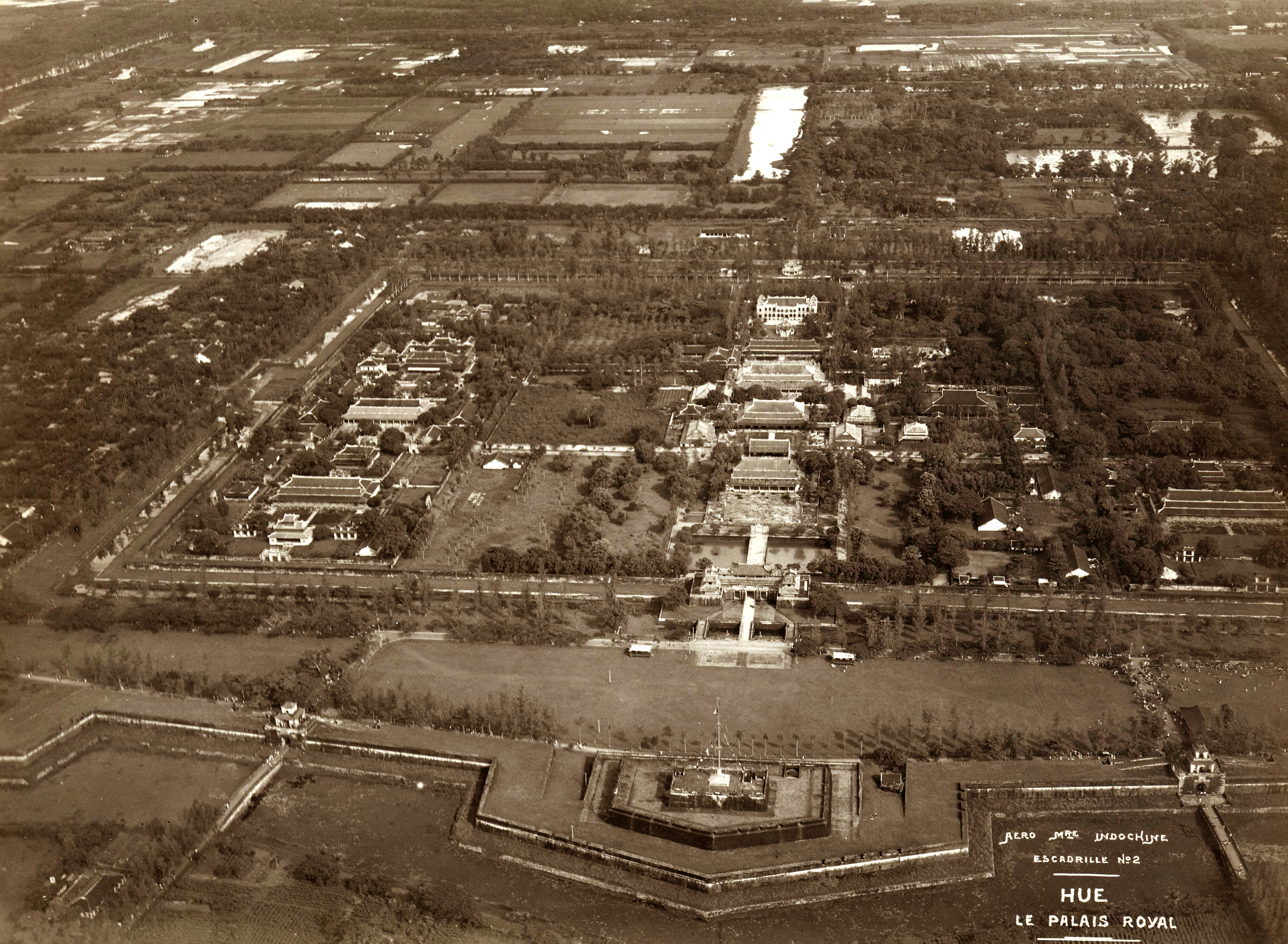
Panoramic view of the Imperial City of Huế before the war was ravaged

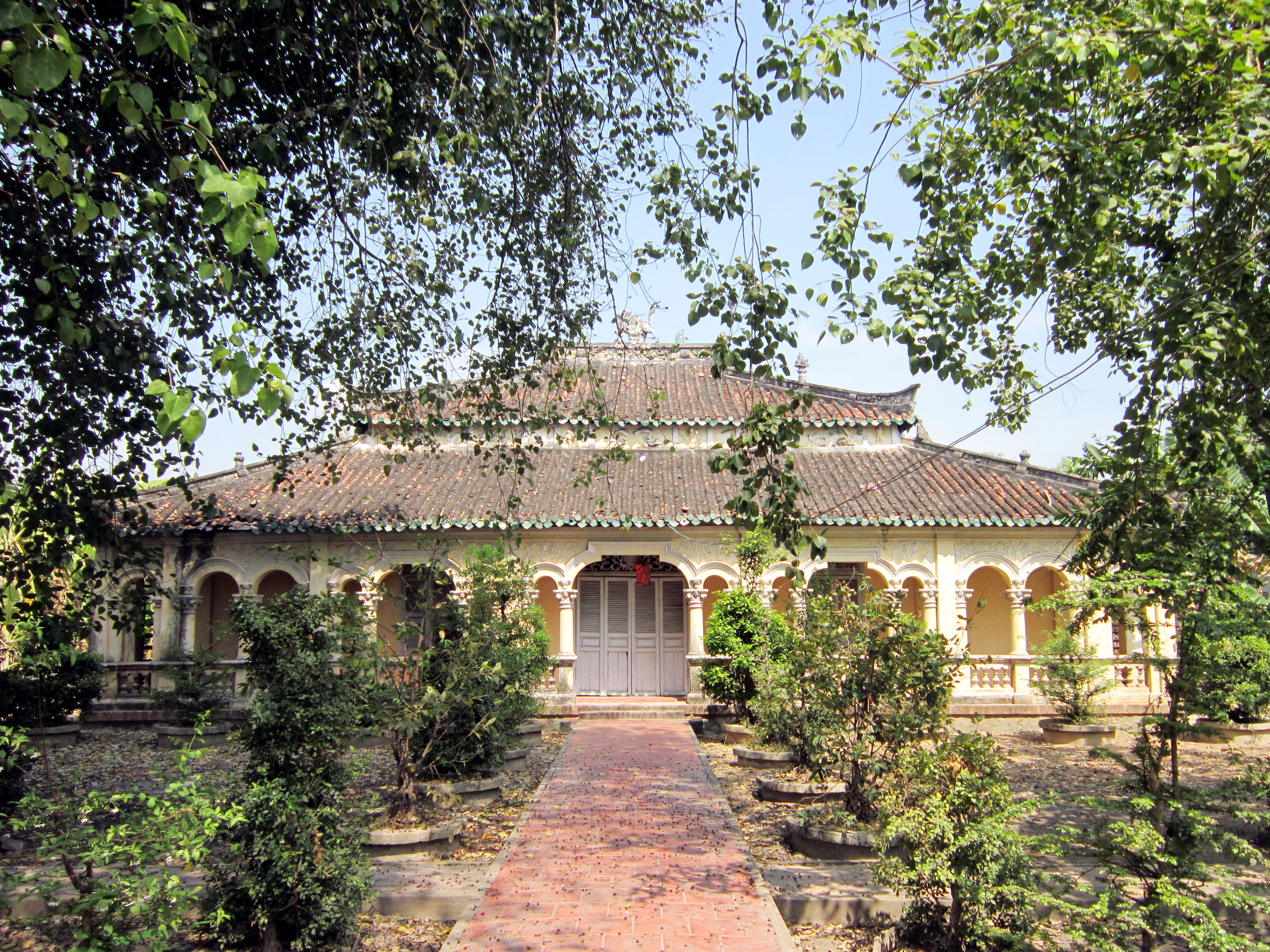
Đình Mỹ Lương, Mỹ Lương commune, Cái Bè district, Tiền Giang

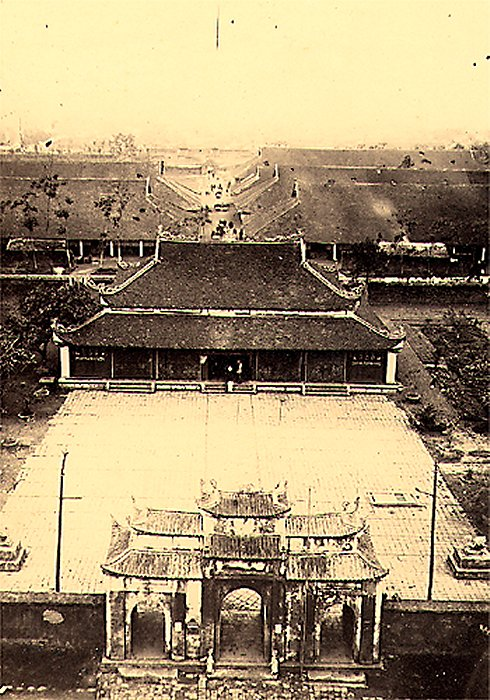
Sơn Tây citadel under Nguyễn dynasty

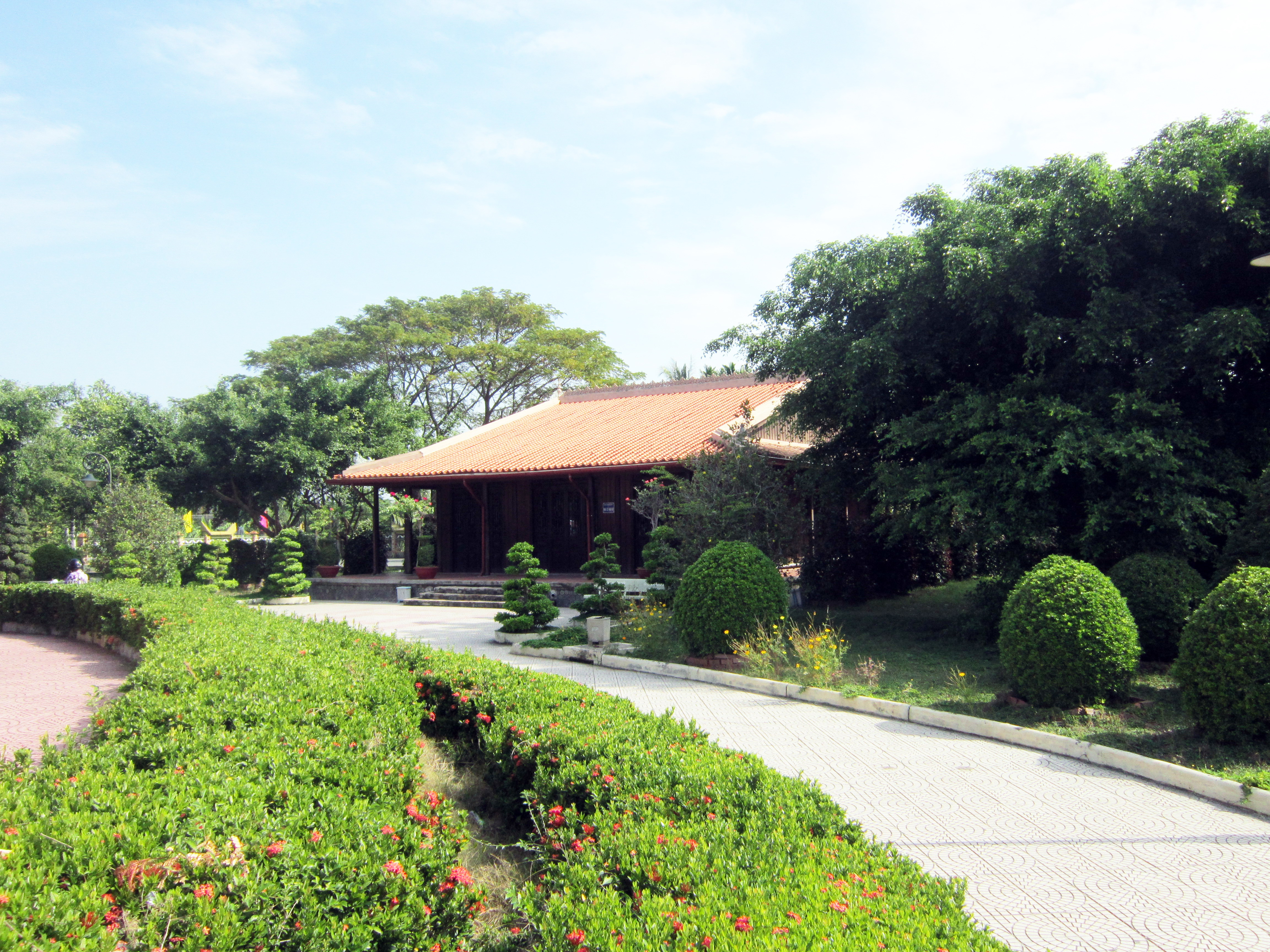
Traditional house in the south of Vietnam

== See also ==
- Vietnamese garden
- Tam quan
- Trụ biểu
- Hòn non bộ
- Đình
