= The Amazing Race Norge 1 =

Season of television series

- Season 1
- Presented by: Freddy dos Santos
- No. of teams: 11
- Winners: Morten & Truls Bjerke
- No. of legs: 13
- Distance traveled: 50,000 km (31,000 mi)
- No. of episodes: 13 (14 including highlights episode)

Release
- Original network: TV 2
- Original release: 11 April – 30 May 2012

Additional information
- Filming dates: 9 January 2012

Series chronology
- Next → Season 2

The Amazing Race Norge 1 is the first season of The Amazing Race Norge, a Norwegian reality competition show based on the American series The Amazing Race. Hosted by football player Freddy dos Santos, it featured eleven teams of two, each with a pre-existing relationship, competing in a race around Eurasia and Oceania to win 500,000 kr and a Subaru XV for each team member for a total worth of 1,000,000 kr. This season visited three continents and eight countries and travelled over 50,000 kilometres (31,000 mi) during thirteen legs. Starting in Oslo, racers travelled through the United Arab Emirates, India, Thailand, Vietnam, Australia, Hong Kong, Macau and Kazakhstan before returning to Norway and finishing in Oslo. The season premiered on 11 April 2012 at 20:00 (CEST) and aired twice a week, every Monday and Wednesday, on TV 2. The finale aired on 30 May 2012 at 21:40 (CEST), with a special highlights episode on 3 June.

Brothers Morten and Truls Bjerke were the winners of this season, while mates Karim Sabeur and Khabat Sarzali finished in second place and best friends Cathrine Andersen and Michelle Holm finished in third place.

== Production ==
=== Development and filming ===
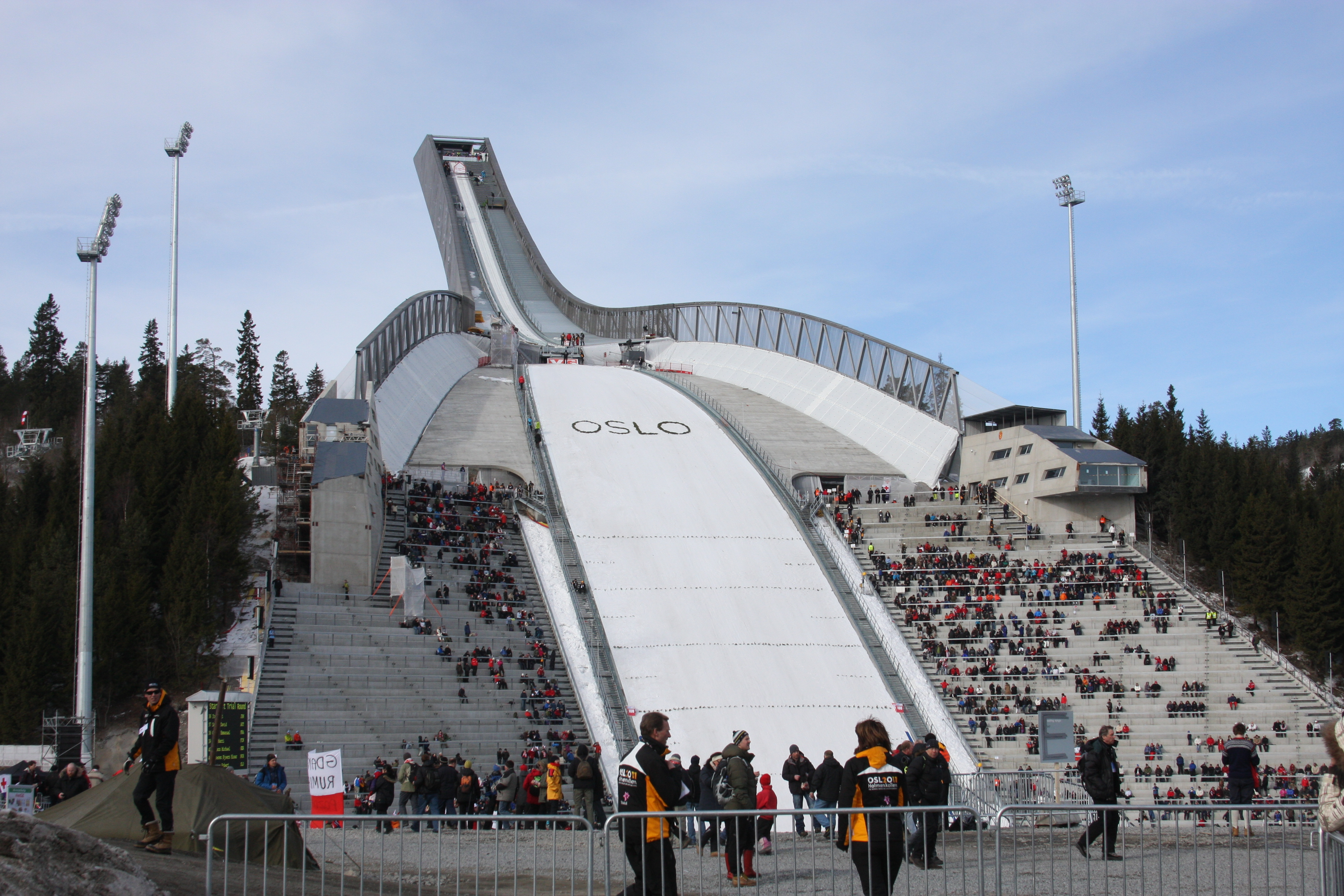
The Starting and Finish Line were at the Holmenkollbakken near Oslo, Norway.

TV 2 greenlit the first season of the series in October 2011. Filming for this season started on 9 January 2012.

This season used various colours for route markers; yellow and red, yellow and white, and yellow and green, whereas in the original version, a single colour scheme is used.

The non-elimination penalty was called a Handicap (Handikap). It affects teams by making a certain task in the next leg harder for the team or by giving a penalty. For example, in the second leg, Martha & Elise had to make 75 dung cakes instead of 50 and make a higher stack of dried dung cakes than the other teams in order to receive their next clue. In Leg 10, the team was required to do both Detours.

This season was the first international spin-off (and second edition to date) in which the location of the Starting Line was also the location of the Finish Line: Holmenkollbakken. The other edition to do so was the ninth season of the original version.

=== Casting ===
Applications were accepted from 11 October 2011 and ended on 31 October 2011.

=== Broadcasting ===
Episodes 11–13 switched from the show's regular scheduled air dates and times slots for a football championship.

=== Marketing ===
The season's sponsors include Hotels.com, Nordea, Proffice, and Subaru.

=== The Team's Video Blogs ===
Each team were given a video camera before the competition. Teams could record a video diary during their free time, travels between destinations, or record reflections about the leg, or even events after checking into the Pit Stop.

== Cast ==
Contestants	Age	Relationship	Hometown	Status
Kenneth Holt	32	Co-workers	Oslo	Eliminated 1st (in Oslo, Norway)
Hakan Pandul	32	Co-workers	Oslo	Eliminated 1st (in Oslo, Norway)
Pål Christian Egeberg	32	Third Cousins	Hamar	Eliminated 2nd (in Agra, India)
Ivar Juliussen	39	Third Cousins	Hamar	Eliminated 2nd (in Agra, India)
Martha Berberg	22	Sisters	Kristiansand	Eliminated 3rd (in Jaipur, India)
Elise Berberg	25	Sisters	Kristiansand	Eliminated 3rd (in Jaipur, India)
Vilde Enge	20	Friends	Oslo	Eliminated 4th (in Hanoi, Vietnam)
Bjarne Drevland	31	Friends	Kragerø	Eliminated 4th (in Hanoi, Vietnam)
Julie Aamodt	28	Dating	Oslo	Eliminated 5th (in Huế, Vietnam)
Vichy Ericsson	30	Dating	Gothenburg, Sweden	Eliminated 5th (in Huế, Vietnam)
Tor Einar Holen	42	Father & Daughter	Malme	Eliminated 6th (in Blue Mountains National Park, Australia)
Cathrine Holen	22	Father & Daughter	Malme	Eliminated 6th (in Blue Mountains National Park, Australia)
Kari Setsaas	44	Married	Høvringen	Eliminated 7th (in Macau)
Bjørn Setsaas	64	Married	Høvringen	Eliminated 7th (in Macau)
Frank Falander	26	Twins	Flatdal	Eliminated 8th (in Almaty, Kazakhstan)
Ivar Falander	26	Twins	Flatdal	Eliminated 8th (in Almaty, Kazakhstan)
Michelle Holm	29	Best Friends	Holmestrand	Third Place
Cathrine Andersen	29	Best Friends	Oslo	Third Place
Karim Sabeur	26	Mates	Oslo	Second Place
Khabat Sarzali	27	Mates	Oslo	Second Place
Morten Bjerke	34	Brothers	Bodø	Winners
Truls Bjerke	30	Brothers	Bodø	Winners

== Results ==
The following teams participated in the season, with their relationships at the time of filming. Note that this table is not necessarily reflective of all content broadcast on television due to inclusion or exclusion of some data. Placements are listed in finishing order:

Team	Position (by leg)													Roadblocks performed
Team	1	2	3	4	5	6	7	8	9	10	11	12	13	Roadblocks performed
Morten & Truls	4th	1st	2nd	2nd	1st	6th	2nd	1st	1st	4th	1st	2nd	1st	Morten 5, Truls 6
Karim & Khabat	1st	9th	4th	1st	2nd	1st	1st	3rd	3rd	1st	3rd	1st	2nd	Karim 6, Khabat 5
Cathrine & Michelle	7th	2nd	1st	3rdε^{4}^{,}^{5}	7th	5th	4th	5th	4th	2nd	2nd	3rd	3rd	Cathrine 4^{5}, Michelle 7
Frank & Ivar	8th	4th	3rd	7th	3rd	2nd	3rd	4th	2nd	3rd	4th	4th^{7}		Frank 6, Ivar 5
Kari & Bjørn	9th^{2}	5th	5th	6th	4th	4th	5th	2nd	5th	5th	5th^{6}			Kari 5, Bjørn 6
Tor Einar & Cathrine	6th	7th	7th	5th	5th	3rd	6th	6th						Tor Einar 3, Cathrine 5
Julie & Vichy	2nd	3rd	8th	4th	6th	7th								Julie 3, Vichy 3
Bjarne & Vilde	3rd	6th	6th	8th	8th									Bjarne 3, Vilde 2
Martha & Elise	10th	8th	9th											Martha 2, Elise 1
Pål Christian & Ivar	5th	10th^{3}												Pål Christian 2, Ivar 0
Kenneth & Hakan	11th^{1}													Kenneth 0, Hakan 0

Key

- A red team placement indicates that the team was eliminated.
- An underlined blue team placement indicates that the team came in last on a non-elimination leg and were penalised with a Handicap (Handikap) in the next leg.
- A purple ε indicates that the team decided to use the Express Pass on that leg.

Notes

1. Kenneth & Hakan were the last team to complete the task at the Oslo Airport and were eliminated as per the provisions of Leg 1's rules (see below).
2. Kari & Bjørn initially arrived 4th, but were issued a 1-hour penalty for not travelling in an Abra boat from Dubai's Creek to the Gold Souk as the clue has specified. Five teams checked in during the penalty time dropping them to 9th place.
3. Pål Christian & Ivar were issued a 4-hour penalty for quitting the Roadblock. Already in last place, they were allowed to check in at the Pit Stop and were eliminated without the 4-hour penalty being issued.
4. Cathrine & Michelle elected to use the Express Pass to bypass the additional task at the theatre in Leg 4.
5. Cathrine & Michelle initially arrived 1st, but were issued a 1-hour penalty for knocking over and picking through the thinner side of the ice block instead of it being left upright at the Roadblock. Karim & Khabat and Morten & Truls checked-in during the penalty time, dropping Cathrine & Michelle to 3rd place.
6. Kari & Bjørn were issued a 4-hour penalty for quitting the Handicap. Already in last place, they were allowed to check in at the Pit Stop and were eliminated without the 4-hour penalty being issued.
7. Frank & Ivar arrived last at the Green Bazaar after it closed and were unable to buy the ingredients for their final task. Instead, they were instructed to wait for Cathrine & Michelle to finish the task then go directly to the Pit Stop to be eliminated.

== Race summary ==
Route of The Amazing Race Norge.

Destinations	Air travel Rail travel Water travel Bus travel Helicopter travel Bicycle travel Gondola travel
Route Markers	Veivalg (Detour) Veisperring (Roadblock) Handikap (Handicap) Pitstop (Pit Stop)

=== Leg 1 (Norway → United Arab Emirates) ===
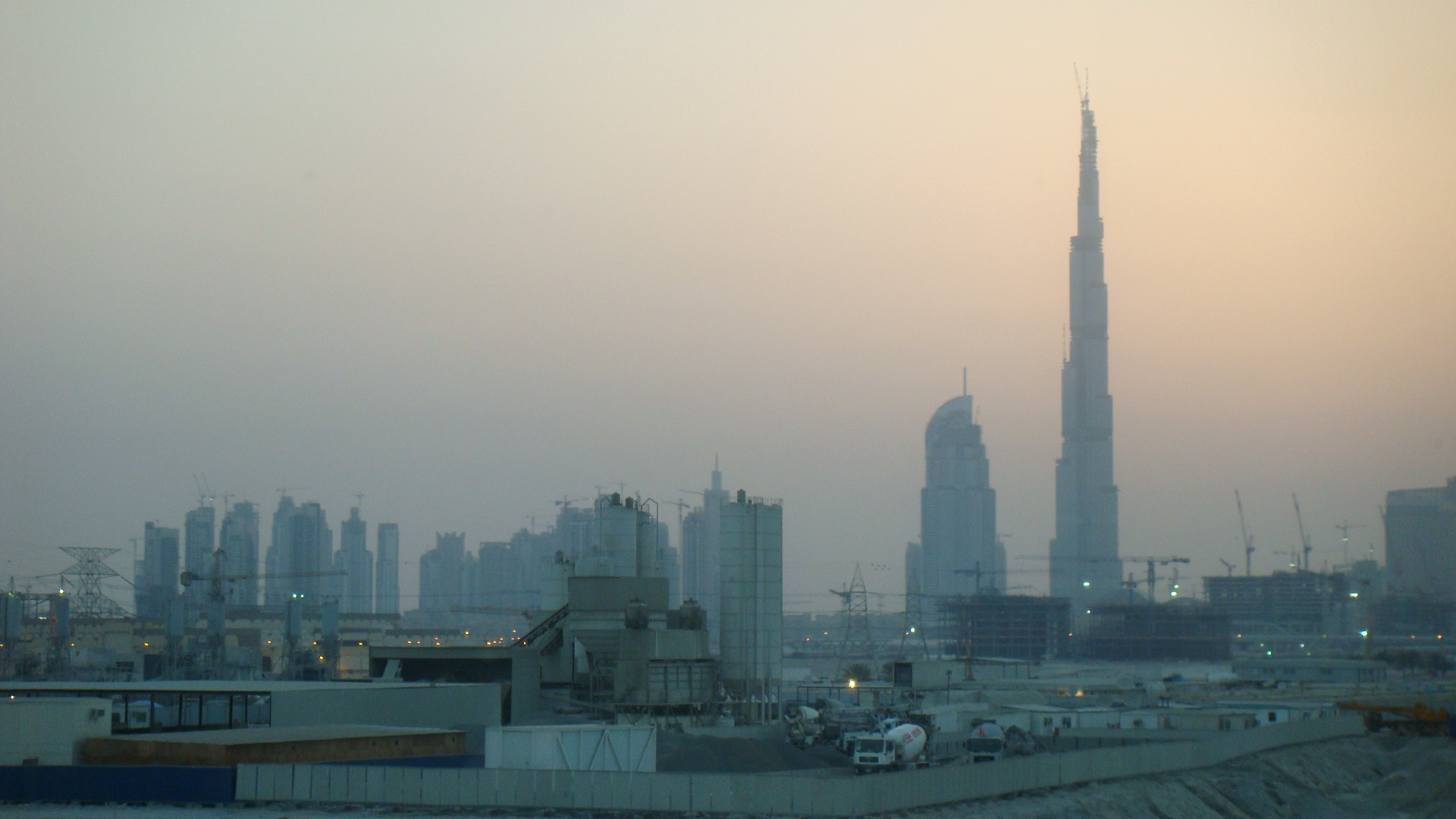
The first leg of The Amazing Race Norge took teams to the Dubai in the United Arab Emirates, including a visit to the Burj Khalifa (far right).

- Episode 1 (11 April 2012)
- Eliminated: Kenneth & Hakan

Locations

- Oslo, Norway (Holmenkollbakken) (Starting Line)
- Oslo (Oslo Airport, Gardermoen) (Elimination Point)
- Oslo (Oslo Airport, Gardermoen) → Dubai, United Arab Emirates (Dubai International Airport)
- Lahbab (Camel Reproduction Centre)
- Palm Jumeirah (Atlantis, The Palm – Aquarium)
- Palm Jumeirah (Atlantis, The Palm – Leap of Faith)
- Palm Jumeirah (Atlantis, The Palm – Aquaventure) → Dubai (Gateway Station)
- Dubai (Dubai Creek)
- Dubai (Dubai Gold Souk)
- Dubai (Al Nafis Jewellers, Mandavi Jewellery & Sona Jewellery or Dubai Harbour)
- Dubai (Burj Khalifa – Top Entrance)
- Dubai (Burj Park)

Episode summary

- Teams began at Holmenkollbakken in Oslo and had to match three phrases written in different languages (Russian, Arabic and Chinese) with the flags of the countries where they are spoken (Russia, United Arab Emirates and China) in order to receive their next clue. Teams then drove to the airport and had to search for one of only ten clues located in four different areas of the airport (Information Desk, Lost Property, the Café and the Passengers Assistance). Each area had a limited number of clues, and the last team without a clue was eliminated.
- Once in Dubai, teams had to search the airport for a camel owner named "Hassan". Once the team found Hassan, they were driven to their next destination: the Camel Reproduction Centre. There, one team member had to ride a camel, while their partner guided it through a course, in order to receive their next clue. Teams were then driven to Atlantis, The Palm and found their next clue at the aquarium.
- In this series' first Roadblock, one team member had to don a wetsuit and retrieve their next clue in a shark tank at the Atlantis, The Palm.
- After the Roadblock, teams had to slide down the Leap of Faith water slide in order to receive their next clue. Teams then had to travel via monorail back to Dubai, via taxi to the Dubai Creek and via abra to the Dubai Gold Souk, where they had to search for their next clue.
- This series' first Detour was a choice between Carat (Karat) or Smart Carry (Bære Smart). In Carat, teams had to travel to Al Nafis Jewellers, where they received a bag with an address written on it in Arabic. After arriving at the Mandavi Jewellery, teams received another bag with their next address. After delivering this bag to Sona Jewellery, teams received their next clue. In Smart Carry, teams had to find a boat going from Dubai to Iran in the Dubai harbour and load ten large bags onto the boat in order to receive their next clue.
- After the Detour, teams had to search the top entrance of the Burj Khalifa for their next clue, which directed them to the Pit Stop: the Burj Park.

Additional note

- This was a non-elimination leg.

=== Leg 2 (United Arab Emirates → India) ===
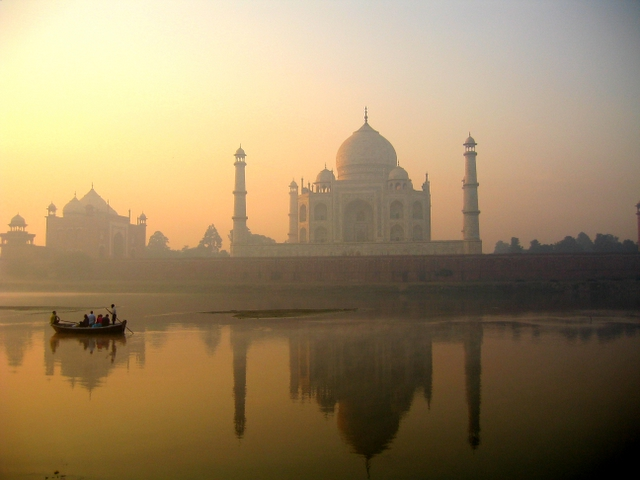
India's famous Taj Mahal was the second Pit Stop of the inaugural Amazing Race Norge.

- Episode 2 (16 April 2012)
- Eliminated: Pål Christian & Ivar

Locations

- Dubai (Burj Park)
- Dubai (Dubai International Airport) → Delhi, India (Indira Gandhi International Airport)
- Delhi (Sarai Kale Khan Inter-State Bus Terminus) → Agra (Idgah Bus Stand)
- Agra (Agra Fort)
- Agra (Katara Medical Store)
- Agra (Jain Carpet Industries & Diamond Carpets or J.K Cottage Industries)
- Agra (Kachpura Village)
- Agra (Mehtab Bagh)

Episode summary

- At the start of this leg, teams were instructed to fly to Delhi, India, and then travel by bus to Agra. Once there, teams found their next clue at Agra Fort. There, teams had to search for three kings, who gave them a puzzle piece, located in different areas of the fort. When teams had the three puzzle pieces, they had to decipher the message – Shah Jehan's wife is next to the black throne. – and search for her in order to receive their next clue. Teams then had to travel in a horse-drawn carriage called a tanga to their next clue at the Katara Medical Store.
- This leg's Detour was a choice between Wool (Ull) or Stone (Stein). In Wool, teams had to travel to Jain Carpet Industries and deliver 50 kilograms (110 lb) of coloured wool to Diamond Carpets in order to receive their next clue. In Stone, teams had to travel to J.K Cottage Industries and use a special wetgrinder to grind a small mosaic tile small enough to fit in the middle of a stone circle in order to receive their next clue.
- After the Detour, teams had to travel to Kachpura Village, where they had to make 50 dung cakes and stack 200 dried dung cakes into a pile in order to receive their next clue. For their Handicap, Martha & Elise had to make 75 dung cakes and stack 300 of them.
- In this leg's Roadblock, teams had to travel to Mehtab Bagh, where one team member had to assemble a 120-piece jigsaw puzzle of the Taj Mahal. Once complete, teams could check in at the Pit Stop.

=== Leg 3 (India) ===
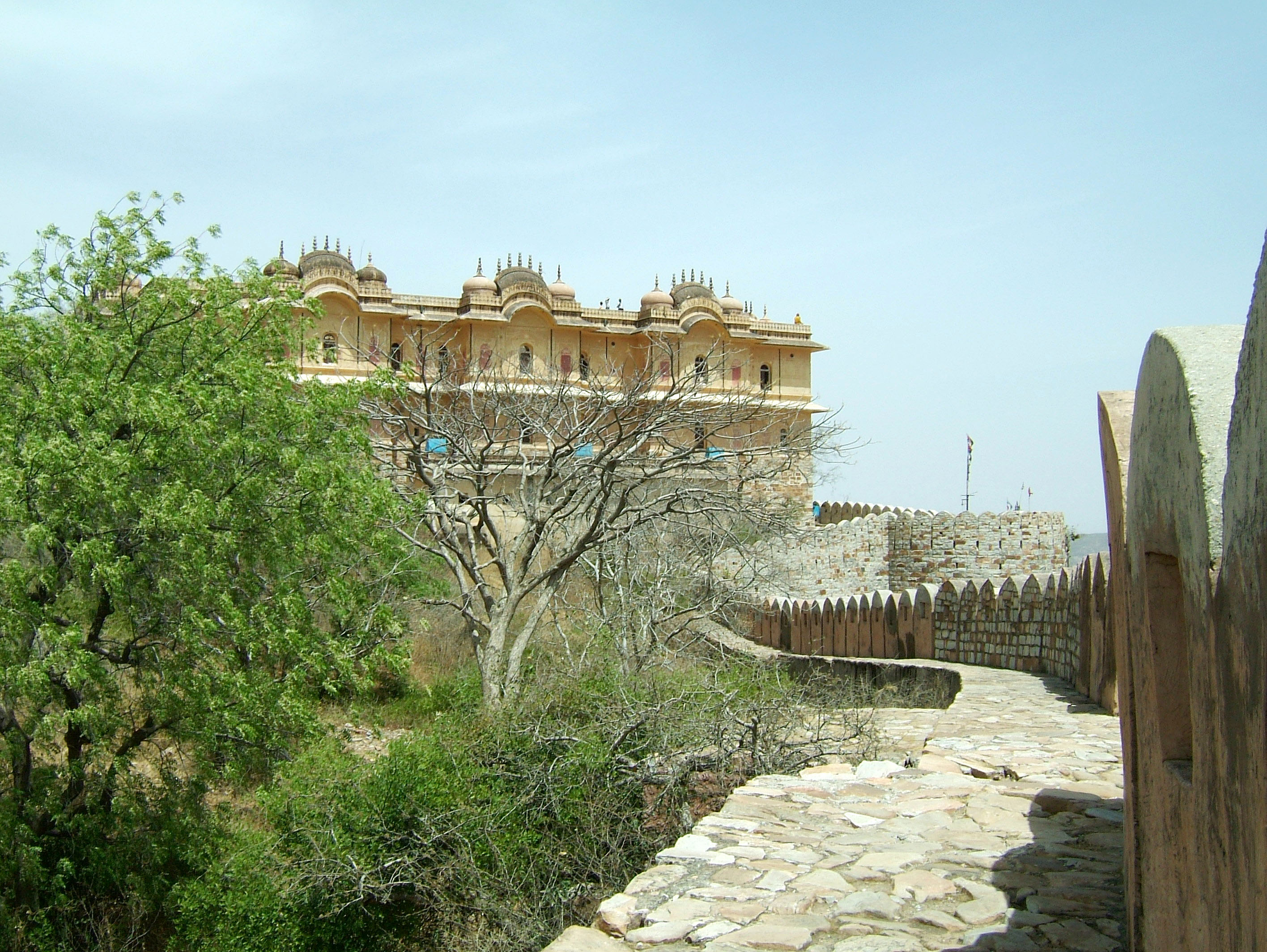
Jaipur's Nahargarh Fort was the third Pit Stop on The Amazing Race Norge.

- Episode 3 (18 April 2012)
- Prize: The Express Pass (Note: An item that can be used to skip any one task of the team's choosing up until the 8th leg. If a team gets eliminated without using their Express Pass, the winner of the last leg gets the Express Pass.) (awarded to Cathrine & Michelle)
- Eliminated: Martha & Elise

Locations

- Agra (Wyndham Grand Agra Hotel)
- Rajasthan (Popliya Ky Dhany)
- Amber (Panna Meena ka Kund)
- Jaipur (Ramdulari Pandey ki Printing Factory)
- Jaipur (Red Elephant Temple)
- Jaipur (House No. 7)
- Jaipur (Nahargarh Fort)

Episode summary

- At the start of this leg, teams were instructed to travel by taxi to the village of Popliya Ky Dhany in order to find their next clue. There, teams had to make two pieces of an Indian flatbread called chapati in order to receive their next clue, which directed them to Panna Meena ka Kund in Amber.
- In this leg's Roadblock, one team member had to search through the boxes among the stepwell for a gem which they could exchange for their next clue.
- After the Roadblock, teams had to travel to the Ramdulari Pandey ki Printing Factory in Jaipur, where they had to silkscreen two patterns onto a bolt of fabric, the second of which was disguised in a Devanagari-like script that instructed them to find the dyeing man and exchange the bolt for another one with their next destination printed on it: the Red Elephant Temple.
- The leg's Detour was a choice between Slow and Painful (Langsomt og Vond) or Short and Brutal (Kort og Brutalt). In Slow and Painful, teams had to lie on a bed of nails. In Short and Brutal, teams had to walk across a bed of hot charcoals on fire. After either task, a priest gave teams a blessing and their next clue.
- After the Detour, teams had to travel to House No. 7 and crush chili in order to receive their next clue, which directed them to the Pit Stop: the Nahargarh Fort.

=== Leg 4 (India → Thailand) ===
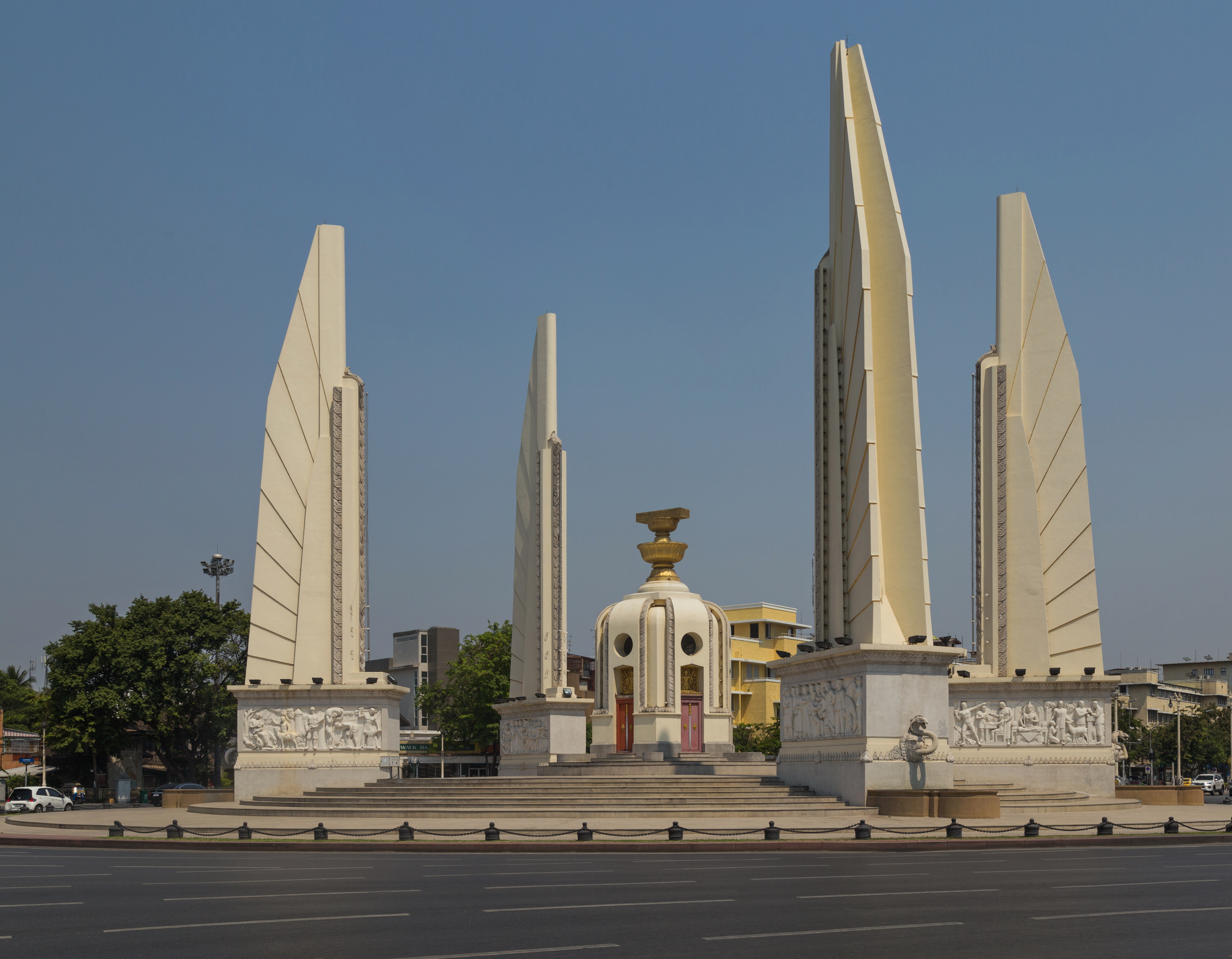
While in Bangkok, teams visited the Democracy Monument where they had to count the cannon-shaped decorations around it in order to get their next clue.

- Episode 4 (23 April 2012)
- Prize: An 8,000 kr gift certificate (awarded to Karim & Khabat)

Locations

- Jaipur (Nahargarh Fort)
- Jaipur (Jaipur International Airport) → Bangkok, Thailand (Suvarnabhumi Airport)
- Bangkok (Khlong Phadung Krung Kasem Floating Market)
- Bangkok (Aksra Theatre)
- Bangkok (Nang Loeng Market or Kickboxing Arena)
- Bangkok (Tha Maharatch)
- Bangkok (Democracy Monument)
- Bangkok (Wat Saket – Golden Mount)

Episode summary

- At the start of this leg, teams were instructed to fly to Bangkok, Thailand. Once there, teams had to travel to the Khlong Phadung Krung Kasem Floating Market in order to find their next clue. There, teams had to purchase one kilogram (2.2 lb) each of dragon fruits, guavas, longans, monkey apples and star fruits in order to receive their next clue. Teams then had to travel to the Aksra Theatre and perform a puppet show in order to receive their next clue. Cathrine & Michelle used their Express Pass to bypass this task.
- This leg's Detour was a choice between Scattered (Dandere) or Mangled (Maltraktere). In Scattered, teams had to travel to the Nang Loeng Market and make a garland called a phuang malai in order to receive their next clue. In Mangled, teams had to break a piece of bamboo using Muay Thai in order to receive their next clue.
- After the Detour, teams found their next clue at Tha Maharatch.
- In this leg's Roadblock, one team member had to pick their way through a block of ice without moving it in order to retrieve their next clue.
- After the Roadblock, teams had to travel to the Democracy Monument and count the number of cannons (75) surrounding the perimeter in order to receive their next clue, which directed them to the Pit Stop: Wat Saket.

Additional note

- This was a non-elimination leg.

=== Leg 5 (Thailand → Vietnam) ===
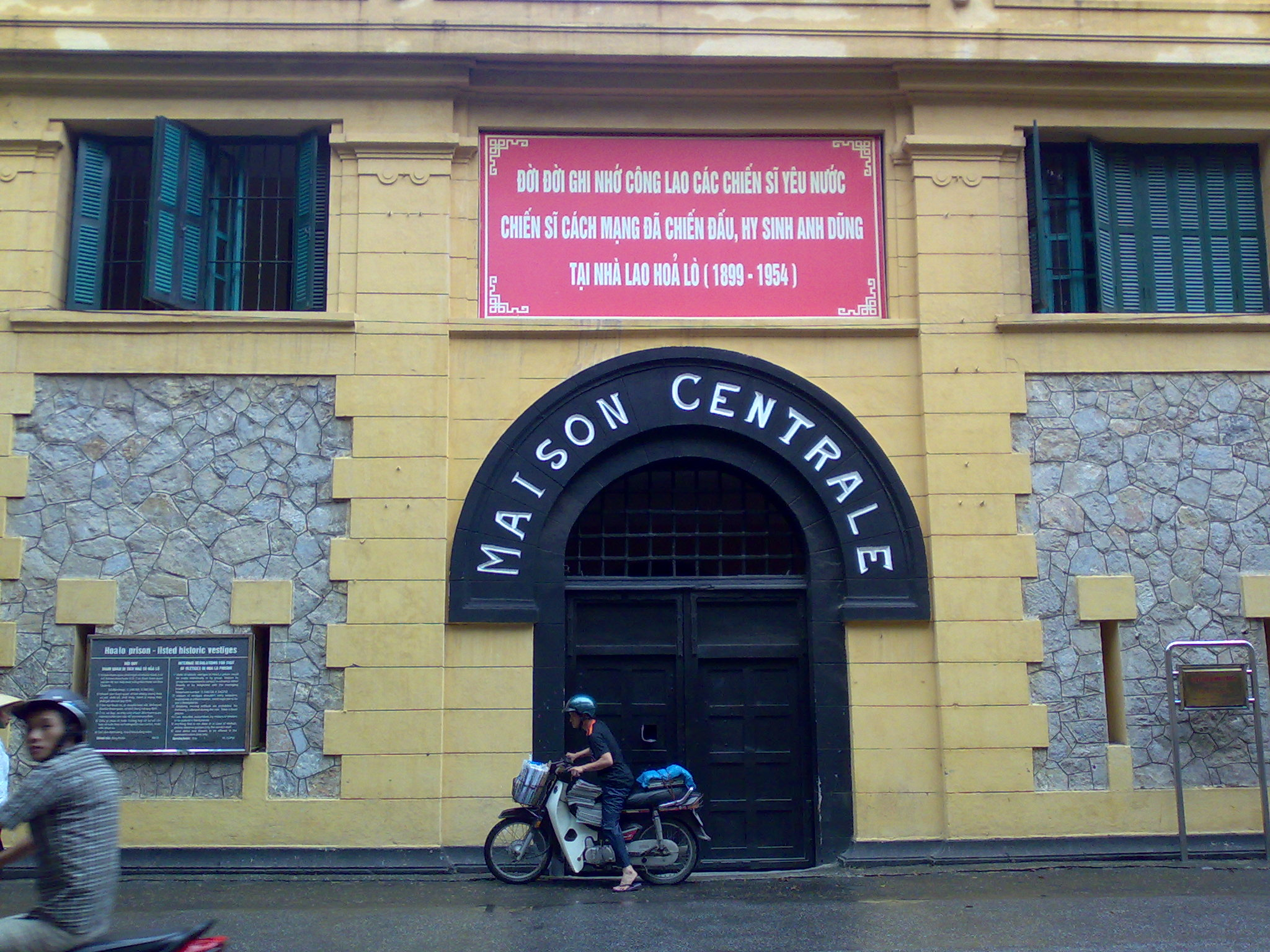
While visiting Hanoi, teams visited Hỏa Lò Prison, also known as the "Hanoi Hilton", where American Senator John McCain was detained during the Vietnam War.

- Episode 5 (25 April 2012)
- Eliminated: Bjarne & Vilde

Locations

- Bangkok (The Patra Hotel - Rama 9)
- Bangkok (Suvarnabhumi Airport) → Hanoi, Vietnam (Noi Bai International Airport)
- Hanoi (Điện Biên Phủ Road – Lenin Statue)
- Hanoi (Hỏa Lò Prison)
- Hanoi (Bến xe Yên Nghĩa) → Phố Vác
- Phố Vác (Church)
- Hanoi (Lệ Mật – Quốc Triệu Restaurant)
- Hanoi (Flag Tower of Hanoi)

Episode summary

- At the start of this leg, teams were instructed to fly to Hanoi, Vietnam. Once there, teams had to locate a statue of Vladimir Lenin on Điện Biên Phủ Road, find "Lenin" and give him a coin in exchange for a photograph of American Senator John McCain in a flight suit. Using the photograph, teams had to figure out the location their next clue: Hỏa Lò Prison. Teams then had to travel by bus to Phố Vác and find their next clue by a church.
- This leg's Detour was a choice between Birdcage (Bure Fugl) or Pluck Birds (Plukke Fugl). In Birdcage, teams had to make a birdcages in order to receive their next clue. In Pluck Birds, teams had to boil and pluck four chickens in order to receive their next clue.
- In this leg's Roadblock, one team member had to prepare and consume snake wine, made from snake blood and bile, and then the snake itself in order to receive their next clue.
- After the Roadblock, teams had to travel to the Flag Tower of Hanoi and solve a large five-piece version of the Tower of Hanoi puzzle before checking into the Pit Stop. For their Handicap, Bjarne & Vilde had to solve a six-piece puzzle.

=== Leg 6 (Vietnam) ===
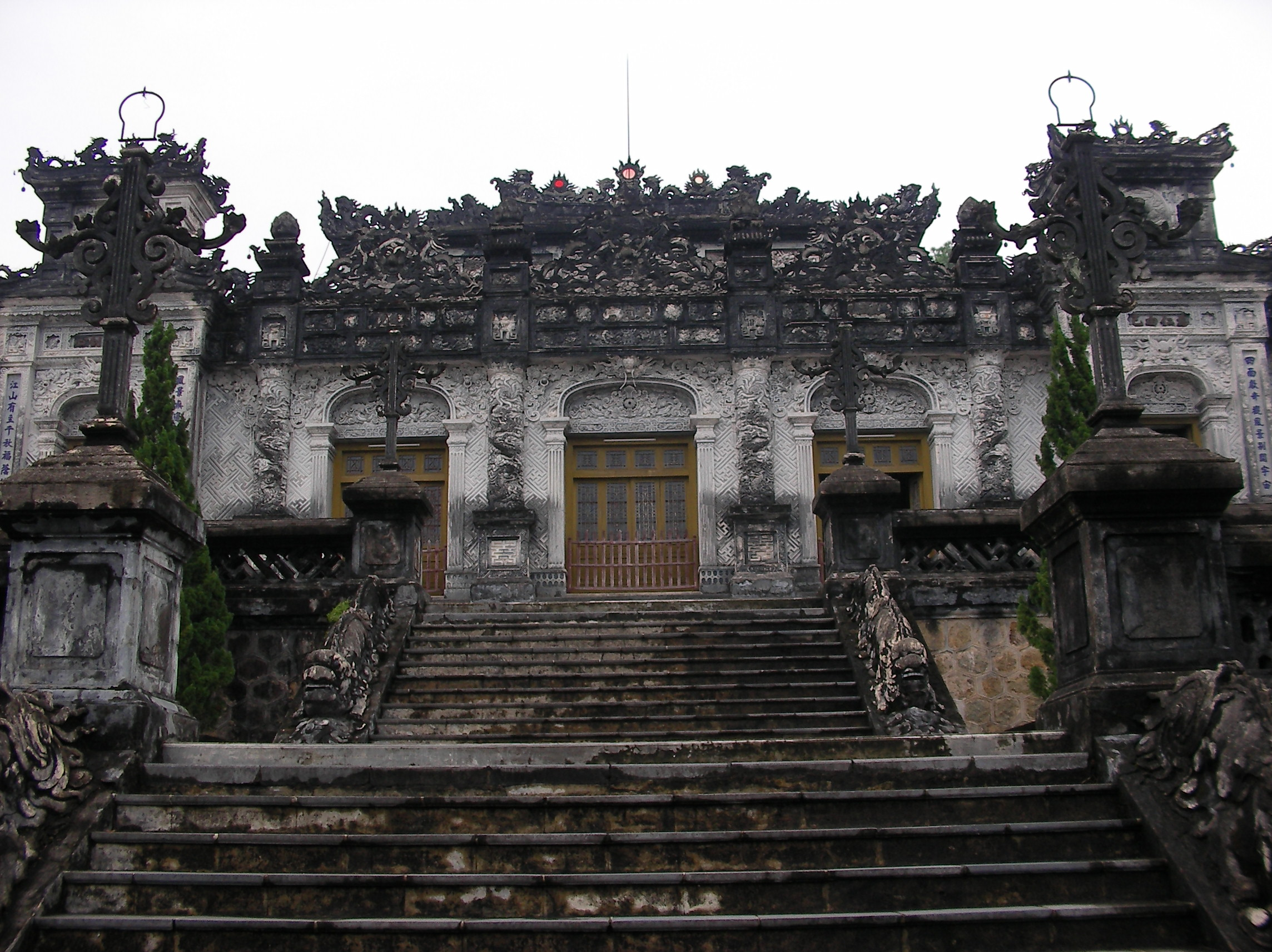
At the Tomb of Khải Định, teams had to present the bouquet they made to get their next clue.

- Episode 6 (30 April 2012)
- Eliminated: Julie & Vichy

Locations

- Hanoi (Flag Tower of Hanoi)
- Hanoi (Camel Bus) → Huế (Huế Bus Station)
- Huế (Tomb of Tự Đức)
- Hương Trà (Tomb of Minh Mạng)
- Hương Thủy (Tomb of Khải Định)
- Huế (Canh Dong Dali or Trung Tâm Giáo Dục Thường Xuyên Phú Yên)
- Huế (Quốc Học High School → Huế Citadel – Forbidden City)

Episode summary

- At the start of this leg, teams were instructed to travel by bus to Huế and then travel to the Tomb of Tự Đức. There, teams had to search the massive complex for Tự Đức's grave, where they found their clues hanging out of reach. After retrieving their clue, teams had to travel to the Tomb of Minh Mạng in Hương Trà.
- In this leg's Roadblock, one team member had to memorise a Vietnamese bouquet, search around the tomb for flower girls with different flowers and then recreate the bouquet in order to receive their next clue.
- After the Roadblock, teams had to travel to the Tomb of Khải Định in Hương Thủy and exchange their bouquet for their next clue.
- This leg's Detour was a choice between In the Ground (På Jordet) or On the Table (På Bordet). In In the Ground, teams had to guide a carabao around a muddy course in order to receive their next clue. In On the Table, teams had to travel to Trung Tâm Giáo Dục Thường Xuyên Phú Yên and properly make 50 sticks of Vietnamese incense in order to receive their next clue.
- After the Detour, teams had to travel to the Quốc Học High School and receive a 30-minute massage before receiving their next clue. Then, one team member had to pedal a cyclo carrying their partner to the Pit Stop: the Huế Citadel.

=== Leg 7 (Vietnam → Australia) ===
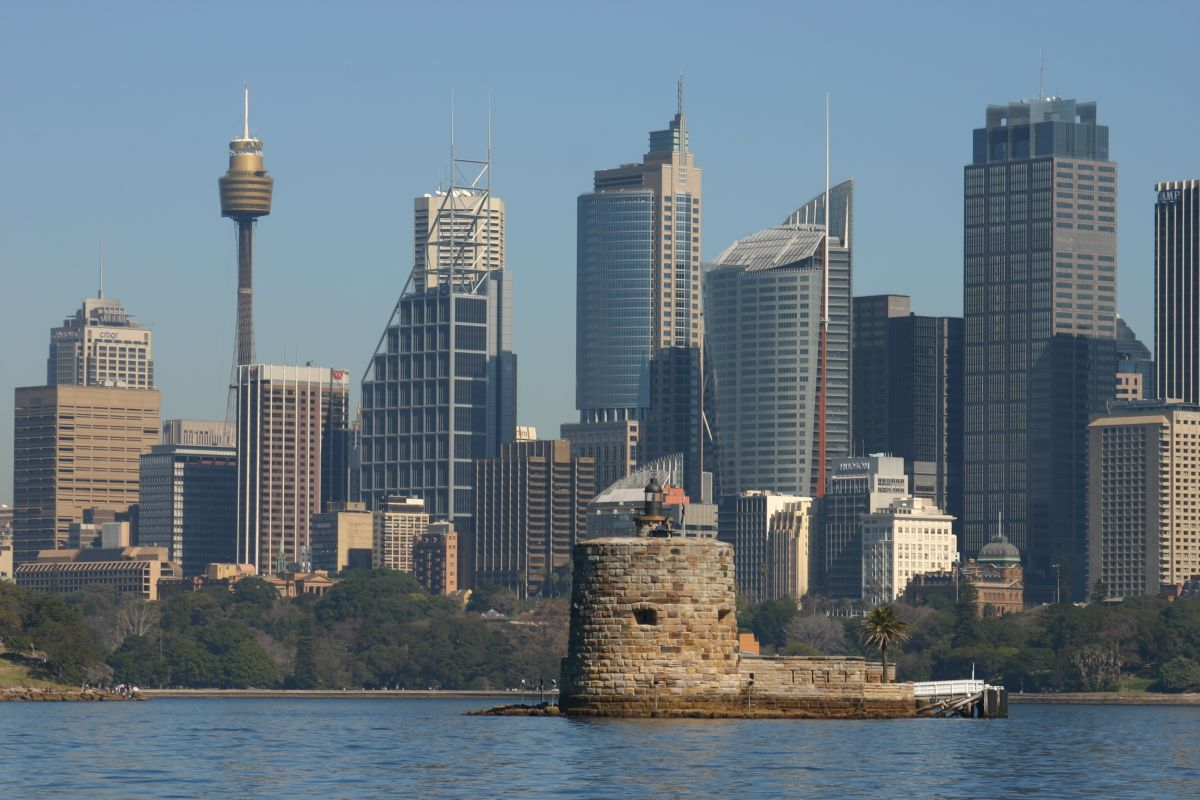
Sydney's Fort Denison was the Pit Stop on the seventh leg.

- Episode 7 (2 May 2012)
- Prize: An 8,000 kr gift certificate (awarded to Karim & Khabat)

Locations

- Huế (TTC Imperial Hotel)
- Da Nang (Marble Mountains – Vân Thông Cave)
- Da Nang (Da Nang International Airport) → Sydney, Australia (Sydney Airport)
- Sydney (Port Botany Seaport)
- Sydney (Coogee Beach)
- Sydney (Dunningham Reserve)
- Sydney (Rushcutters Bay Marina – EastSail) → Sydney Harbour (Fort Denison)

Episode summary

- At the start of this leg, teams were instructed to travel by taxi to the Marble Mountains and search for their next clue, which directed them to fly to Sydney, Australia. Once there, teams had to travel to the Port Botany Seaport, where both team members had to construct a wooden pallet. Then, unbeknownst to them, both team members had to eat a slice of a Vegemite sandwich in order to receive their next clue.
- This leg's Detour was a choice between Ball or Bikini. In Ball, teams had to play a game of beach volleyball and score seven points in order to receive their next clue. In Bikini, teams had to find "the Aussie in a Cossie", a woman wearing a bikini with an Australian flag, who had their next clue.
- In this leg's Roadblock, one team member had to reiterate a series of Australian slang phrases (G'day mate! You look like a stunned mullet! I'm as dry as a dead dingo's donger. Have a go, ya mug!) in order to receive their next clue.
- After the Roadblock, teams had to travel to EastSail and steer a sailboat to Fort Denison in order to receive their next clue, which instructed them to tie three knots before checking in at the Pit Stop.

Additional note

- This was a non-elimination leg.

=== Leg 8 (Australia) ===
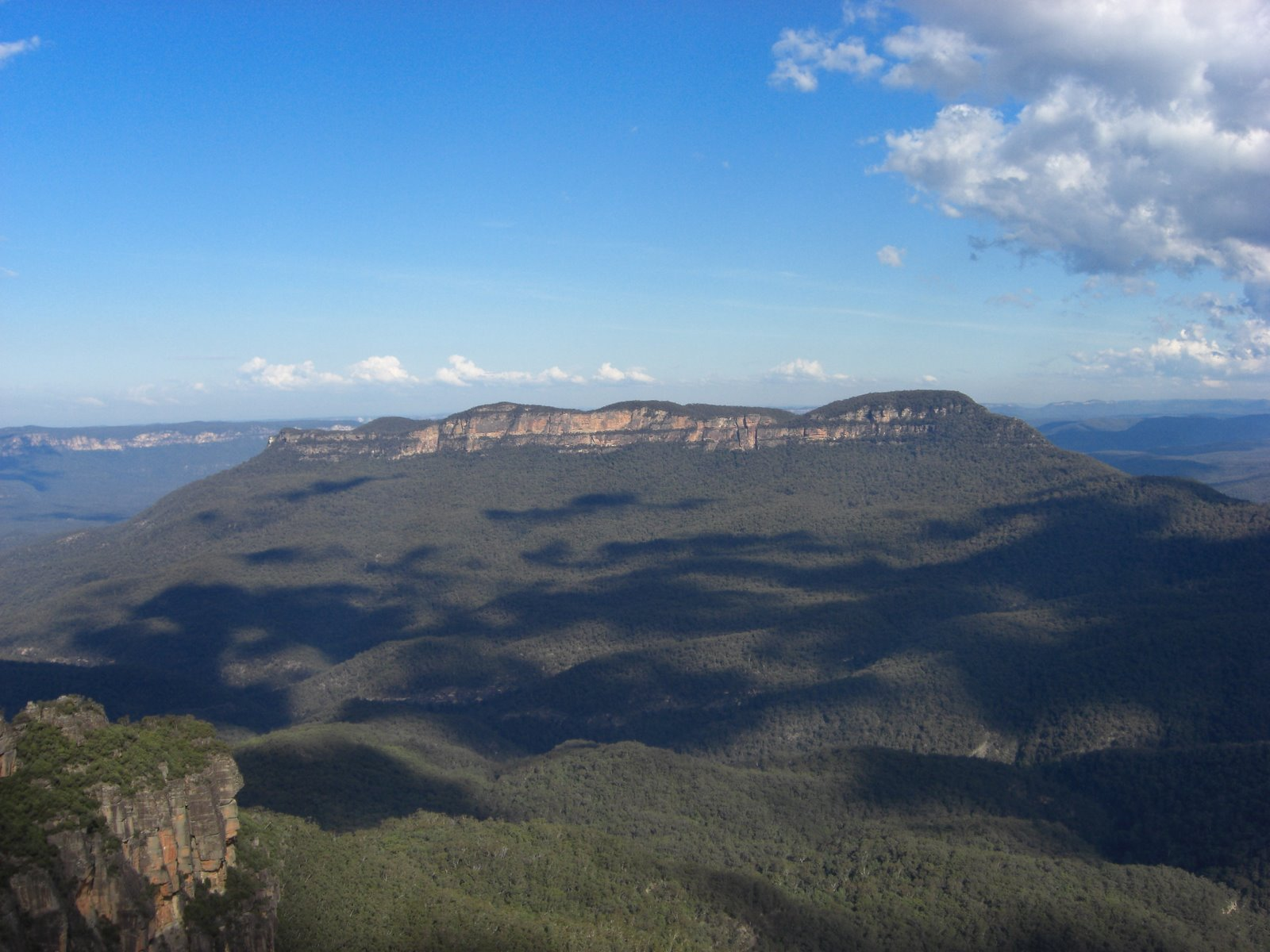
New South Wales' Blue Mountains were the location of this leg of The Amazing Race Norge.

- Episode 8 (7 May 2012)
- Prize: An 8,000 kr gift certificate (awarded to Morten & Truls)
- Eliminated: Tor Einar & Cathrine

Locations

- Sydney (Sydney Harbour Bridge)
- Sydney (Bondi Beach)
- Blue Mountains (Queens Road)
- Blue Mountains National Park (Clearing)
- Blue Mountains National Park (Minni-Ha-Ha Falls)
- Wollondilly Shire (Braeside Road)
- Wollondilly Shire (Kings Tableland)
- Blue Mountains National Park (Boomerang Area)
- Blue Mountains National Park (Pulpit Rock Lookout)

Episode summary

- At the start of this leg, teams were instructed to travel to Bondi Beach. There, teams had to participate in a lifeguard relay. First, one team member had to paddle a surfboard out to a white marker, return to shore and run up a ramp some distance away and back before tagging their partner to do the same relay in order to receive their next clue, which directed them to drive to Queens Road in the Blue Mountains.
- In this leg's Roadblock, one team member had to transfer two snakes from one box to another in order to receive their next clue.
- After the Roadblock, teams drove to Minni-Ha-Ha Falls, found a piece of artwork featuring a snake and had to find the two pieces of the picture that were missing. Behind the waterfall were various boards containing many small pieces, only two of which fit properly into the artwork. The missing pieces were different for each team, and teams were only allowed to bring back two pieces at once. When the picture was complete, teams received their next clue, which directed them to Braeside Road.
- This leg's Detour was a choice between Slow Up (Kort Opp) or Far Down (Langt Ned). In Slow Up, teams had to rock climb up the Mount York cliff in order to receive their next clue. In Far Down, teams had to abseil down a higher cliff in order to receive their next clue.
- After the Detour, both team members had to throw a boomerang so that it landed back their circle in order to receive their next clue, which directed them to travel on foot the Pit Stop: the Pulpit Rock Lookout.
- For their Handicap, Tor Einar & Cathrine had to take a different path toward the Pit Stop, retrieve a tiny stuffed toy koala clipped to a metal pole by Freddy and deliver it to the Pit Stop.

=== Leg 9 (Australia) ===
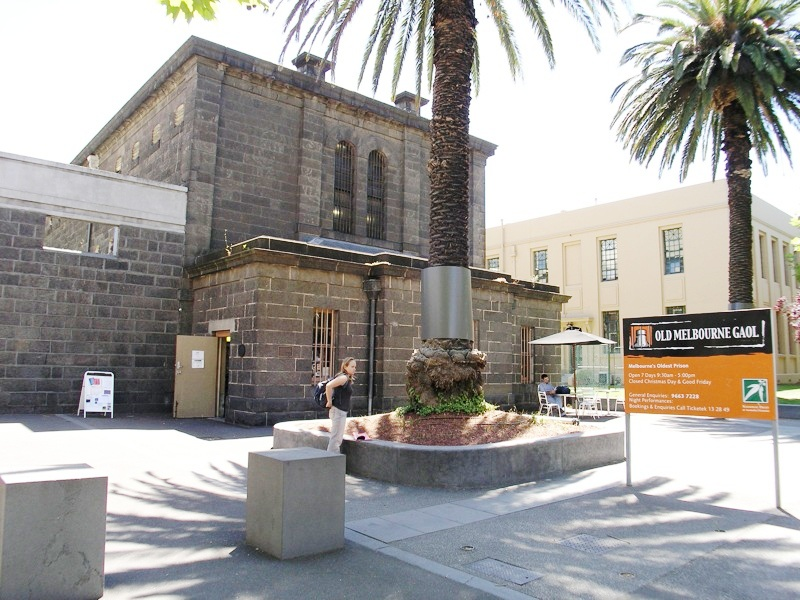
While in Melbourne, teams were "arrested" and thrown into the Old Melbourne Gaol where they had to stay for one hour unless they could solve a riddle that would immediately free them.

- Episode 9 (9 May 2012)

Locations

- Yarra Valley (Maroondah Dam)
- Yering (Lilydale Airport – Melbourne SkyDive Centre)
- Coldstream (Rochford Winery)
- Melbourne (ACDC Lane)
- Melbourne (Old Melbourne Gaol)
- Melbourne (Scotch College or Aegis Park)
- Melbourne (Eureka Tower)
- Melbourne (Eureka Tower – Skydeck 88)

Episode summary

- In this leg's Roadblock, one team member had to skydive into the Rochford Winery in order to reunite with their partner and receive their next clue.
- After the Roadblock, teams had to roll barrels across the vineyard, stack them and serve bottles of wine and food at the Rochford Restaurant in order to receive their next clue. After travelling to ACDC Lane in Melbourne, teams had to find a painting of The Scream and were instructed to trade it with an art handler. However, teams were immediately "arrested", taken to court, "charged" for "stealing the painting" and locked up in the Old Melbourne Gaol. In their jail cell, teams found a riddle ("The prison guard would shout out twelve, the prisoner responded with 6 and was set free. The prison guard would then shout out six and the prisoner responded with 3 and was set free. The prison guard then shouted out ten and the next prisoner shouted out 5 and was hung" – what should the prisoner have shouted?). If teams managed to solve the riddle (3), they were set free and received their next clue. If teams could not solve it, they had to wait an hour before being set free.
- This leg's Detour was a choice between Small Ball (Liten Ball) or Big Ball (Stor Ball). In Small Ball, teams had to play a game of tennis at Scotch College and score two points in order to receive their next clue. In Big Ball, teams had to score three goals in an Australian rules football course at Aegis Park after getting bumped and tackled by a row of players in order to receive their next clue.
- After the Detour, teams found their next clue at the base of the Eureka Tower and had to climb the building's stairs to the next Pit Stop: Skydeck 88 on the 88th floor.

Additional note

- This was a non-elimination leg.

=== Leg 10 (Australia → Hong Kong) ===
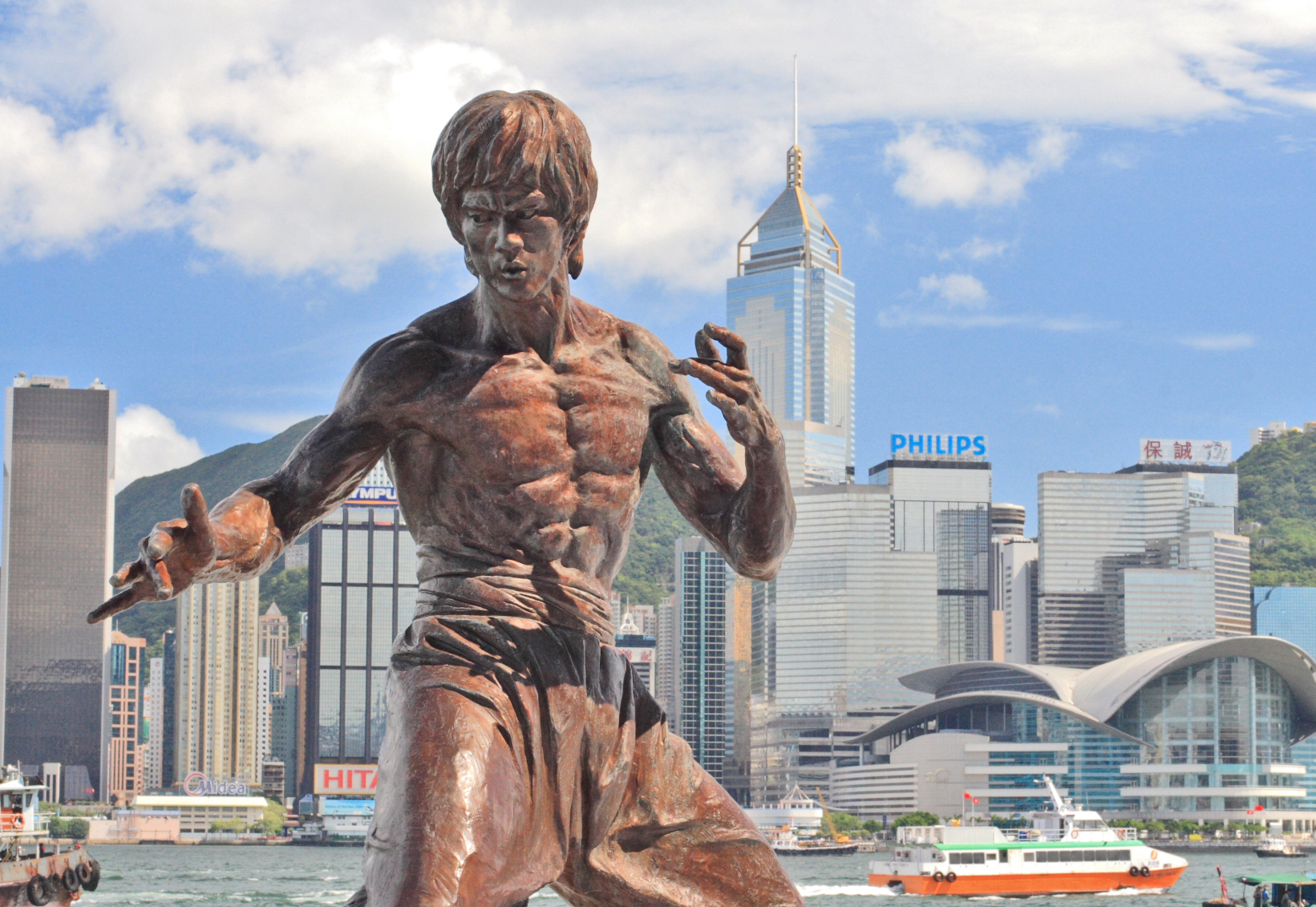
In Hong Kong, teams had to find the statue of world-famous martial artist Bruce Lee on the city-state's Avenue of Stars.

- Episode 10 (14 May 2012)
- Prize: An 8,000 kr gift certificate (awarded to Karim & Khabat)

Locations

- Melbourne (Eureka Tower)
- Melbourne (Melbourne Airport) → Hong Kong (Hong Kong International Airport)
- Hong Kong (Golden Bauhinia Square)
- Hong Kong (Hong Kong Park)
- Hong Kong (Admiralty MTR Station → Ocean Park Station)
- Hong Kong (Ocean Park Hong Kong – Panda Observatory)
- Hong Kong (Stanley Market – Stanley Main Street)
- Hong Kong (Stanley Main Beach)
- Hong Kong (Times Square)
- Hong Kong (Avenue of Stars – Statue of Bruce Lee)
- Hong Kong (Chinese Traditional Kung Fu Association)
- Hong Kong (Tsim Sha Tsui Promenade)

Episode summary

- At the start of this leg, teams were instructed to fly to Hong Kong. Once there, teams found their next clue at the Golden Bauhinia Square.
- This leg's Detour was a choice between Fast Ball (Rask Ball) or Fast Food (Rask Mat). In Fast Ball, teams had to score 10 points in a game of table tennis against a kid in order to receive their next clue. In Fast Food, both team members had to eat a plate of dim sum faster than a competitor in order to receive their next clue. For their Handicap, Kari & Bjørn had to perform both Detour tasks.
- After the Detour, teams had to travel by Citybus to Ocean Park Hong Kong and find their next clue, which was located inside the panda observatory. Teams then had to travel to the Stanley Market and build a pyramid-puzzle so that it matched an example that they could only look at from afar in order to receive their next clue, which directed them to Stanley Main Beach. There, teams had to paddle a dragon boat around a marked course. After receiving their next clue, teams had to search Times Square for a poster featuring Freddy posing for a kung fu film, which directed them to "Find Bruce Lee at the Avenue of Stars".
- In this leg's Roadblock, one team member had to chop wooden planks using kung fu moves in order to receive their next clue, which directed them to the Pit Stop: the Tsim Sha Tsui Promenade.

Additional note

- This was a non-elimination leg.

=== Leg 11 (Hong Kong → Macau) ===
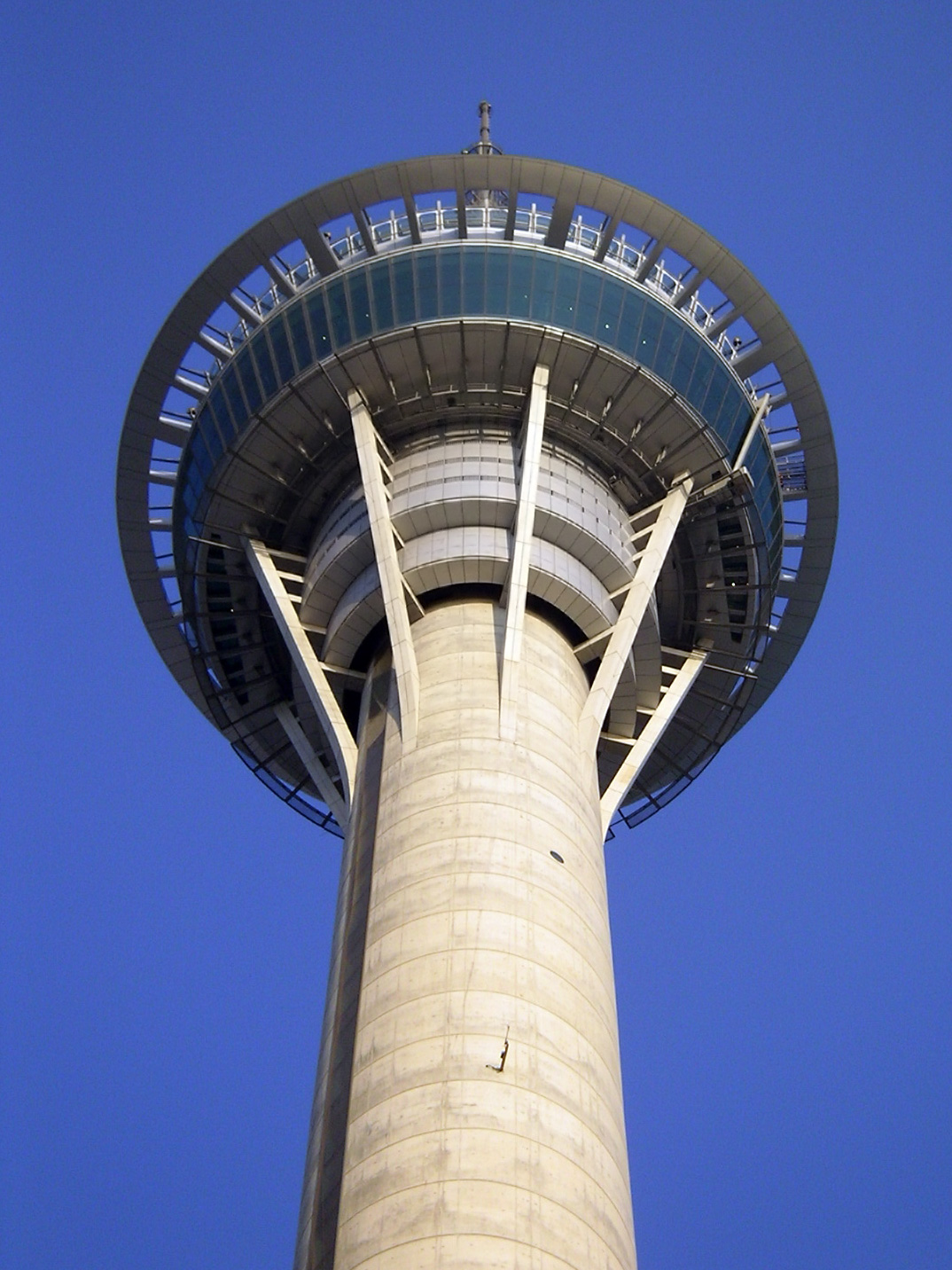
In Macau, teams travelled to the Macau Tower where they had a Roadblock in which one team member of each team SkyJumped from the top.

- Episode 11 (21 May 2012)
- Prize: An 8,000 kr gift certificate (awarded to Morten & Truls)
- Eliminated: Kari & Bjørn

Locations

- Hong Kong (Tsim Sha Tsui Promenade)
- Hong Kong (Hong Kong–Macau Ferry Terminal) → Macau (Outer Harbour Ferry Terminal)
- Macau (Macau Tower – Observation Deck)
- Macau (Macau Tower – Skywalk X)
- Macau (Ruins of Saint Paul's or Senado Square)
- Macau (Senado Square)
- Macau (Senado Square – Restaurant)
- Macau (A-Ma Cultural Village)
- Macau (A-Ma Statue)

Episode summary

- At the start of this leg, teams were instructed to travel by TurboJET ferry to Macau. Once there, teams found their next clue on the observation deck of the Macau Tower. Teams then walk onto the Skywalk X and retrieve their next clue dangling in the air.
- In this leg's Roadblock, one team member had to SkyJump 233 metres (764 ft) from the Macau Tower to receive their next clue.
- This leg's Detour was a choice between Brushed (Pensler) or Sticks (Pinner). In Brushed, teams had to travel to the Ruins of Saint Paul's and write "The Amazing Race" in Chinese characters using a brush in order to receive their next clue. In Sticks, teams had to travel to Senado Square and transfer noodles, beans and tofu to new plates using chopsticks in order to receive their next clue.
- After the Detour, teams had to count the number of Chinese lanterns hanging in Senado Square (157) in order to receive their next clue. Teams then had to travel to a nearby restaurant in Senado Square and reassemble a carved roast pig in order to receive their next clue, which directed them to the A-Ma Cultural Village. There, teams had to make several Portuguese egg tarts called pastéis de nata in order to receive their next clue.
- To check into the Pit Stop at the A-Ma Statue, teams had to light and bring a candle from the A-Ma Cultural Village without the flame getting snuffed out; otherwise, teams had to go back to the village and relight the candle. For their Handicap, Kari & Bjørn had to bring two candles.

=== Leg 12 (Macau → Hong Kong → Kazakhstan) ===
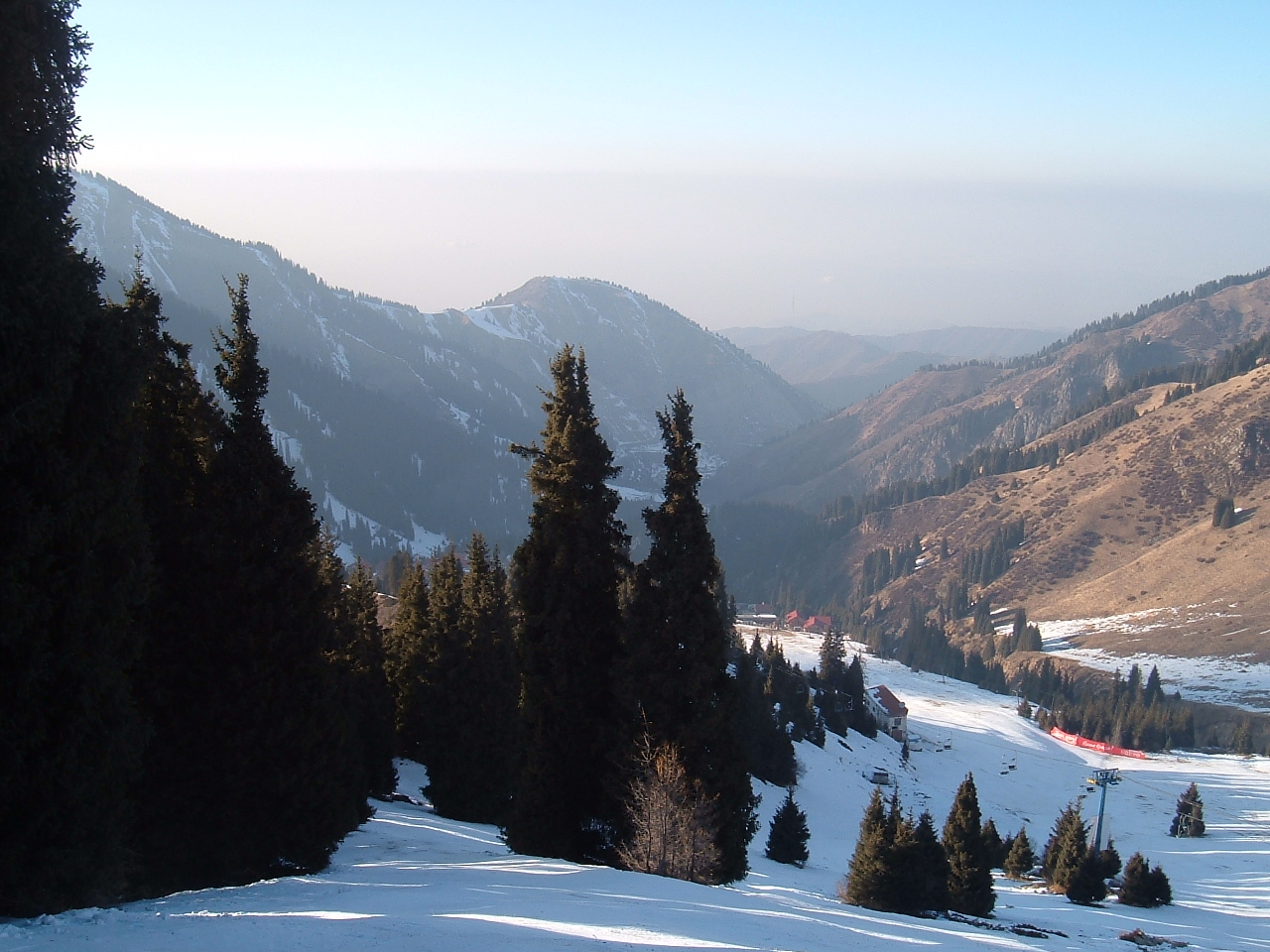
At the Chimbulak Ski Resort, teams had to perform a rescue on the slopes before receiving their next clue.

- Episode (28 May 2012)
- Prize: An 8,000 kr gift certificate (awarded to Karim & Khabat)
- Eliminated: Frank & Ivar

Locations

- Macau (A-Ma Statue)
- Macau (Outer Harbour Ferry Terminal) → Hong Kong (Hong Kong–Macau Ferry Terminal)
- Hong Kong (Hong Kong International Airport) → Almaty, Kazakhstan (Almaty International Airport)
- Almaty (Rakhat Chocolate Factory)
- Almaty (Almaty Sports Centre)
- Almaty (Kók Tóbe Park – The Beatles Statue)
- Almaty (Luxor Hall)
- Almaty (Chimbulak Ski Resort)
- Almaty (Green Bazaar)
- Almaty (Panfilov Park)

Episode summary

- At the start of this leg, teams were given a chocolate bar and were told to travel to where it was made in order to find their next clue: the Rakhat Chocolate Factory in Almaty, Kazakhstan. There, teams had to unwrap 1,500 pieces of chocolate until they found their next clue, which directed them to the Almaty Sports Centre. Teams had to eat every chocolate they opened.
- This season's final Detour was a choice between Jump 300 Metres (Hoppe 300 Meter) or Lift 10 000 kg (Løfte 10 000 kg). In Jump 300 Metres, teams had to jump off diving boards until they dived a cumulative total of 300 metres (980 ft) in order to receive their next clue. In Lift 10 000 kg, teams had to lift a cumulative total of 10,000 kilograms (22,000 lb) in a deadlift exercise in order to receive their next clue.
- After the Detour, teams found their next clue at Kók Tóbe Park.
- In this leg's Roadblock, one team member had to search for their next clue hanging among envelopes marked "The Amazing Fake Norge" on several trees while having snowballs thrown at them.
- After the Roadblock, teams had to travel to Luxor Hall and slide 15 curling stones into a goal in order to receive their next clue. Teams then had to travel to the Chimbulak Ski Resort perform a rescue on the slopes in order to receive their next clue, which directed them to the Green Bazaar. There, teams had to buy items on list, give them to a chef and eat what the chef prepared in order to receive their next clue, which directed them to the Pit Stop: Panfilov Park.

=== Leg 13 (Kazakhstan → Norway) ===
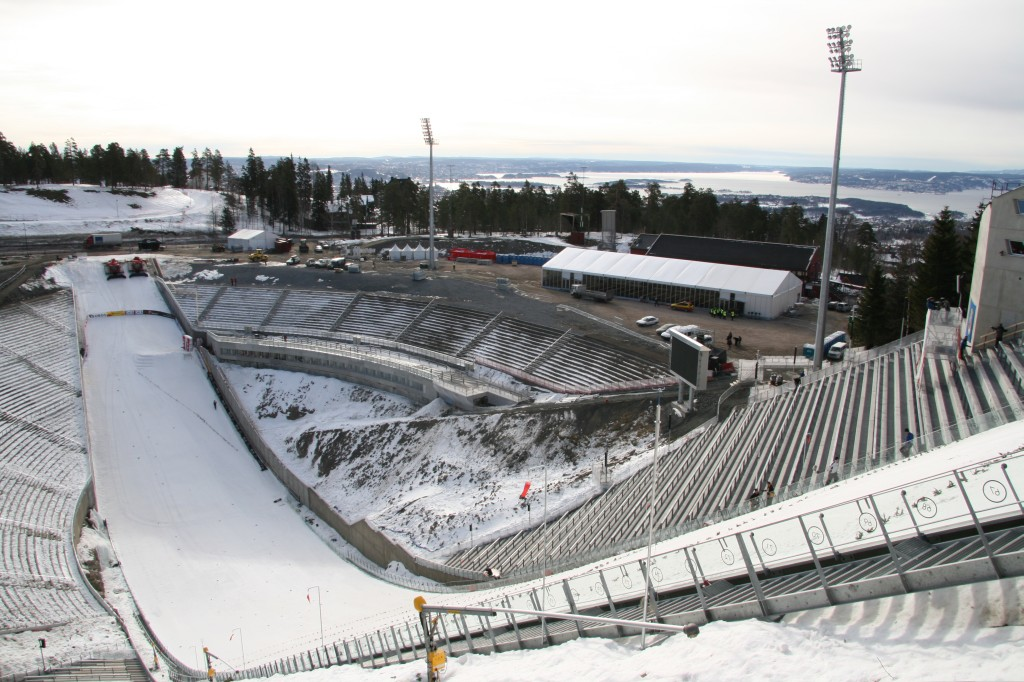
Teams returned to Oslo's Holmenkollbakken for their final task before crossing the Finish Line.

- Episode 13 (30 May 2012)
- Prize: 500,000 kr and a Subaru XV for each team member.
- Winners: Morten & Truls
- Runners-up: Karim & Khabat
- Third place: Cathrine & Michelle

Locations

- Almaty (Panfilov Park)
- Almaty (Almaty International Airport) → Oslo, Norway (Oslo Airport, Gardermoen)
- Oslo (Oslo City)
- Oslo (TV 2 Studios)
- Oslo (Suburbs)
- Oslo (Holmenkollen National Arena)
- Oslo (Holmenkollbakken)

Episode summary

- At the start of this leg, teams were instructed to fly to Oslo, Norway. Once there, teams had to search Oslo City for a sign with two weather forecasters instructing them to go look for them at TV 2's studios. There, teams had to correctly give out a weather forecast in which one team member read a forecast while their partner pointed out the cities mentioned on a weather map. If teams incorrectly identify any of the cities, they were given a map and would have to locate these cities before starting over. Once complete, teams had to deliver wood to three addresses and assemble an IKEA shelf at the last one in order to receive their next clue.
- In this season's final Roadblock, one team member had to complete a winter biathlon. First, they had to ski a one-kilometre (0.62 mi) lap, then shoot five target with a rifle. Racers had to ski 150 metres (490 ft) for each miss. After two rounds, teams received their final clue.
- After the Roadblock, teams had to climb to the top of the Holmenkollbakken and arrange photographs of different items found on previous legs in chronological order. The first team to finish rode a zipline down to the Finish Line.
