= Burj Park =

Park in Dubai

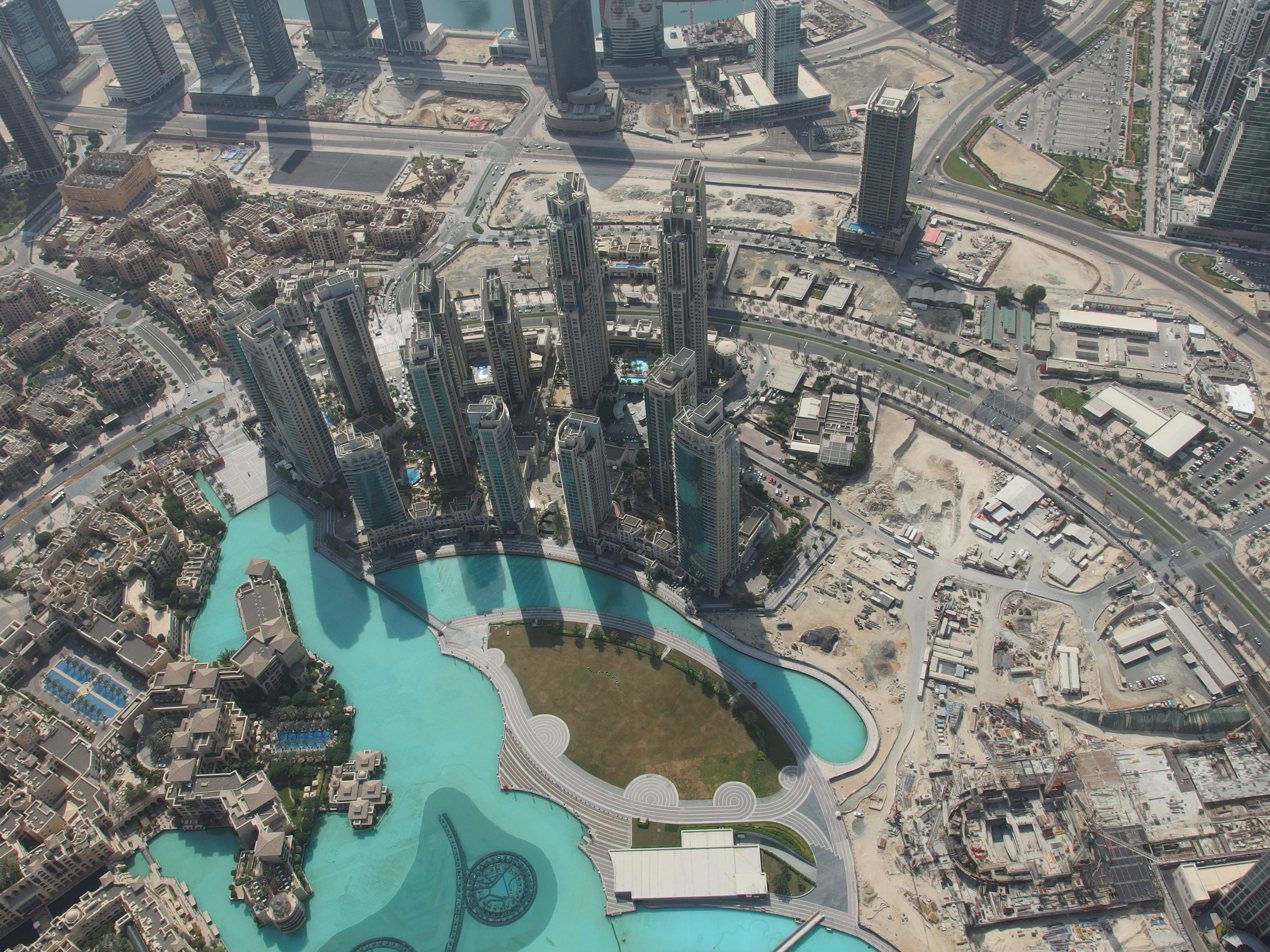
- Burj Park in the middle with the Dubai Fountain
- Interactive map of Burj Park
- Type: Municipal
- Location: Downtown Dubai
- Coordinates: 25°11′39.6″N 55°16′24.4″E
- Area: 11,000 m^{2} (2.718 acres; 0.004 sq mi; 1.100 ha) (Burj Park); 110,000 m^{2} (27.182 acres; 0.042 sq mi; 11.000 ha) (park area surrounding the Burj Khalifa)
- Created: 2010
- Designer: SWA Group
- Owner: Emaar Properties
- Operator: Dubai Municipality: Dubai Public Parks
- Status: Open all year from 9 AM to 11 PM
- Website: https://www.burjparkbyemaar.com/

Burj Park (in Arabic: حديقة برج خلیفة) is a 64 hectares (158.147 acres) urban park located in Dubai, United Arab Emirates. It is built on a manmade island in Burj Lake and also surrounds the base of the Burj Khalifa. The park is a popular spot to view the Dubai Fountains and watch the New Year's fireworks.

== History ==
Burj Park opened in 2010 along with the Burj Khalifa and designed by the SWA Group.

It is used to fire the Iftar Cannon at the end of fasting during Ramadan. The park has also hosted events and TV shows such as Mariah Carey's Caution World Tour, The Amazing Race Norge 1, and the 2016 Men's and Women's PSA World Series Finals as well as the official opening ceremony of the Burj Khalifa.

== Gallery ==
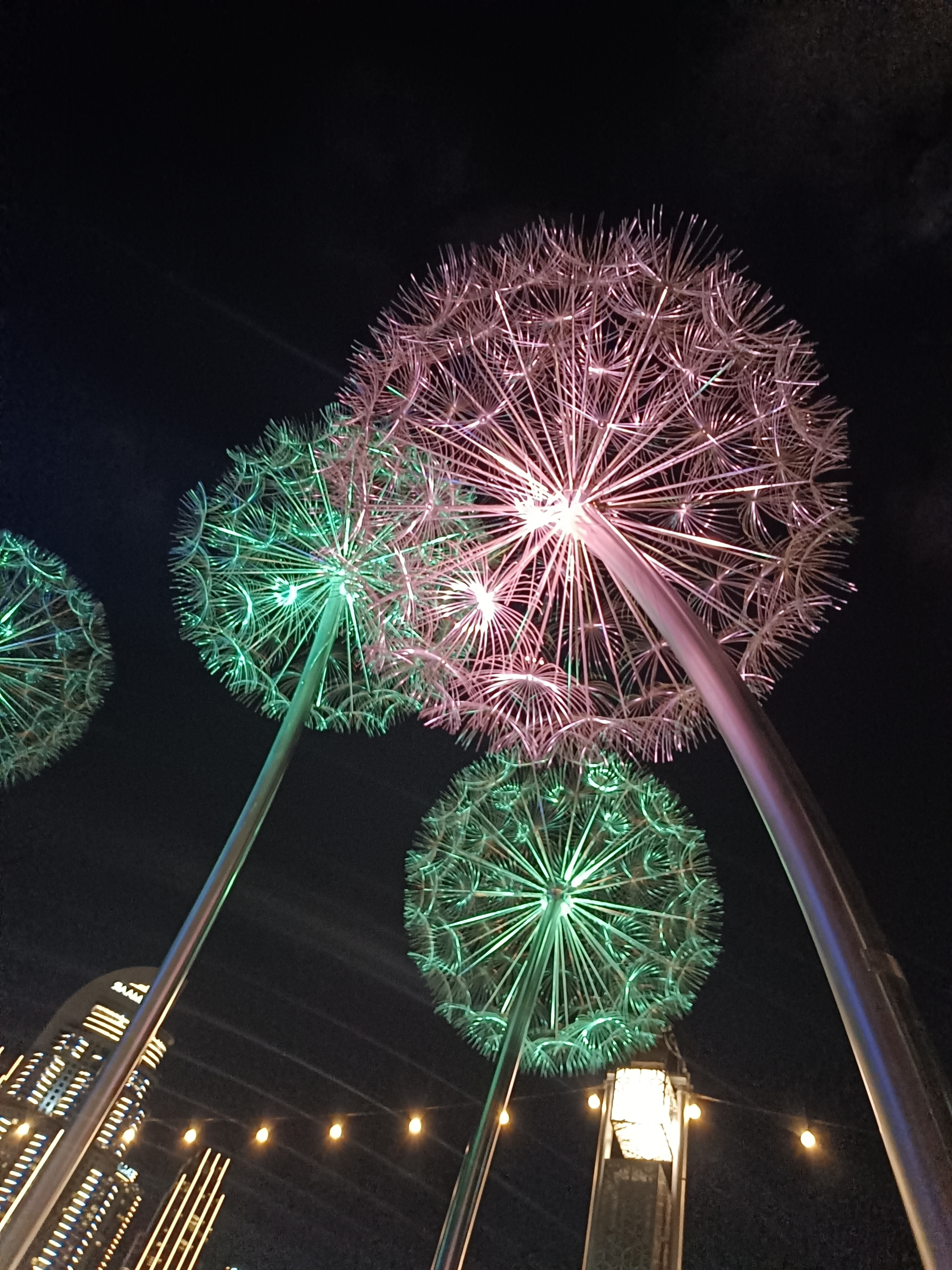
Dandelions sculpture in the park

Iftar Cannon at Burj Park

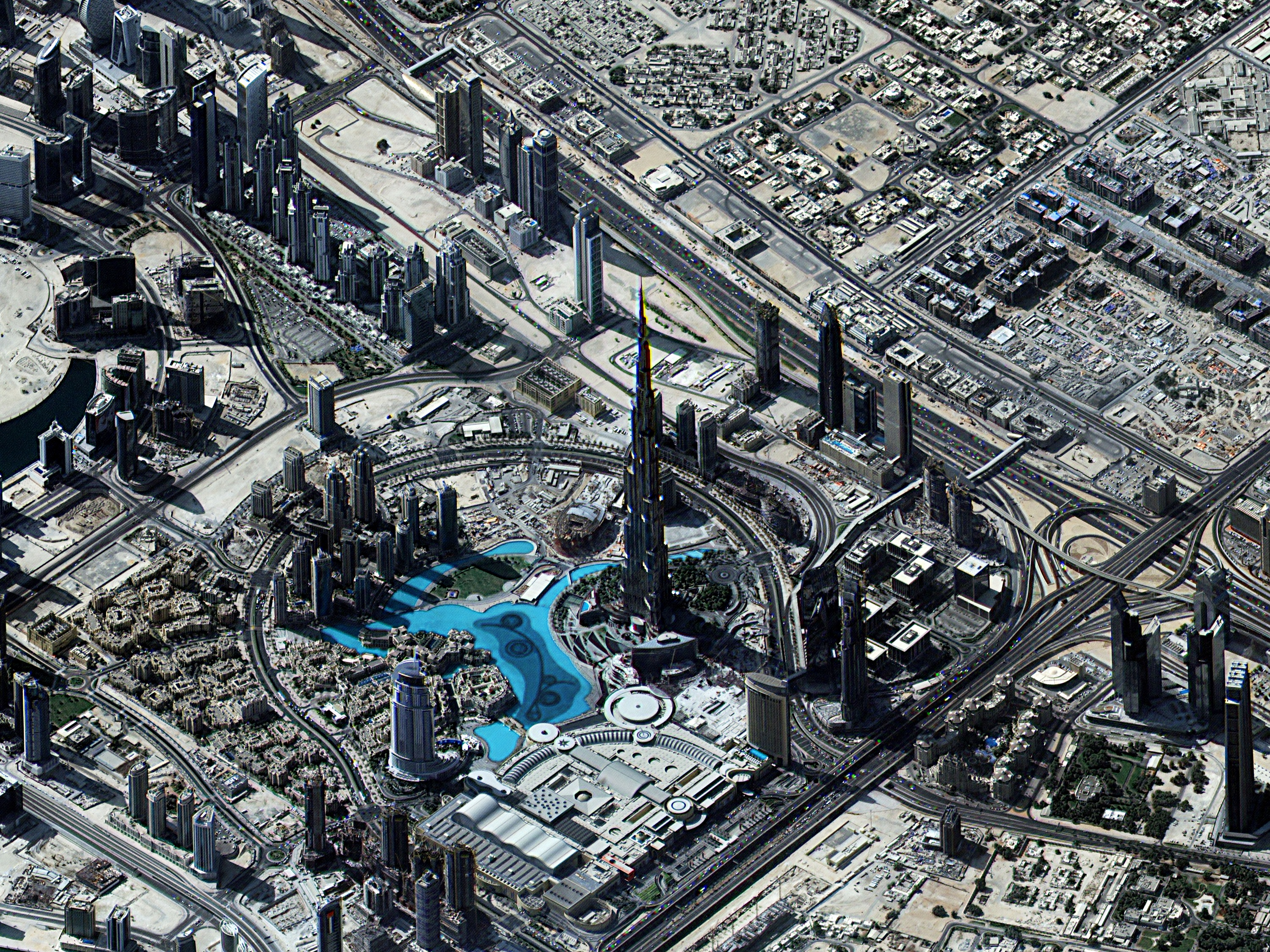
Aerial view showing the park surrounding the Burj Khalifa

== See also ==
- List of parks in Dubai
