= Oslo City =

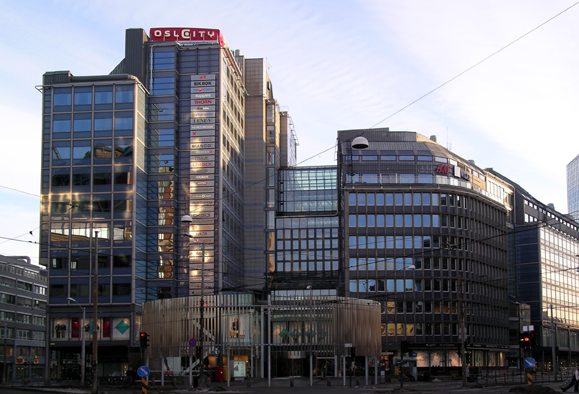
- Interactive map of the Oslo City area

General information
- Type: Shopping center
- Location: Stenersgata 1^{Note that all shops, dining and office tenants have different address} Sentrum, Oslo, Norway; 0050
- Coordinates: 59.9125°N 10.7521°E

Technical details
- Floor count: 5
- Floor area: 26,000 m²

Other information
- Number of stores: 93+

Website
- oslo-city.steenstrom.no

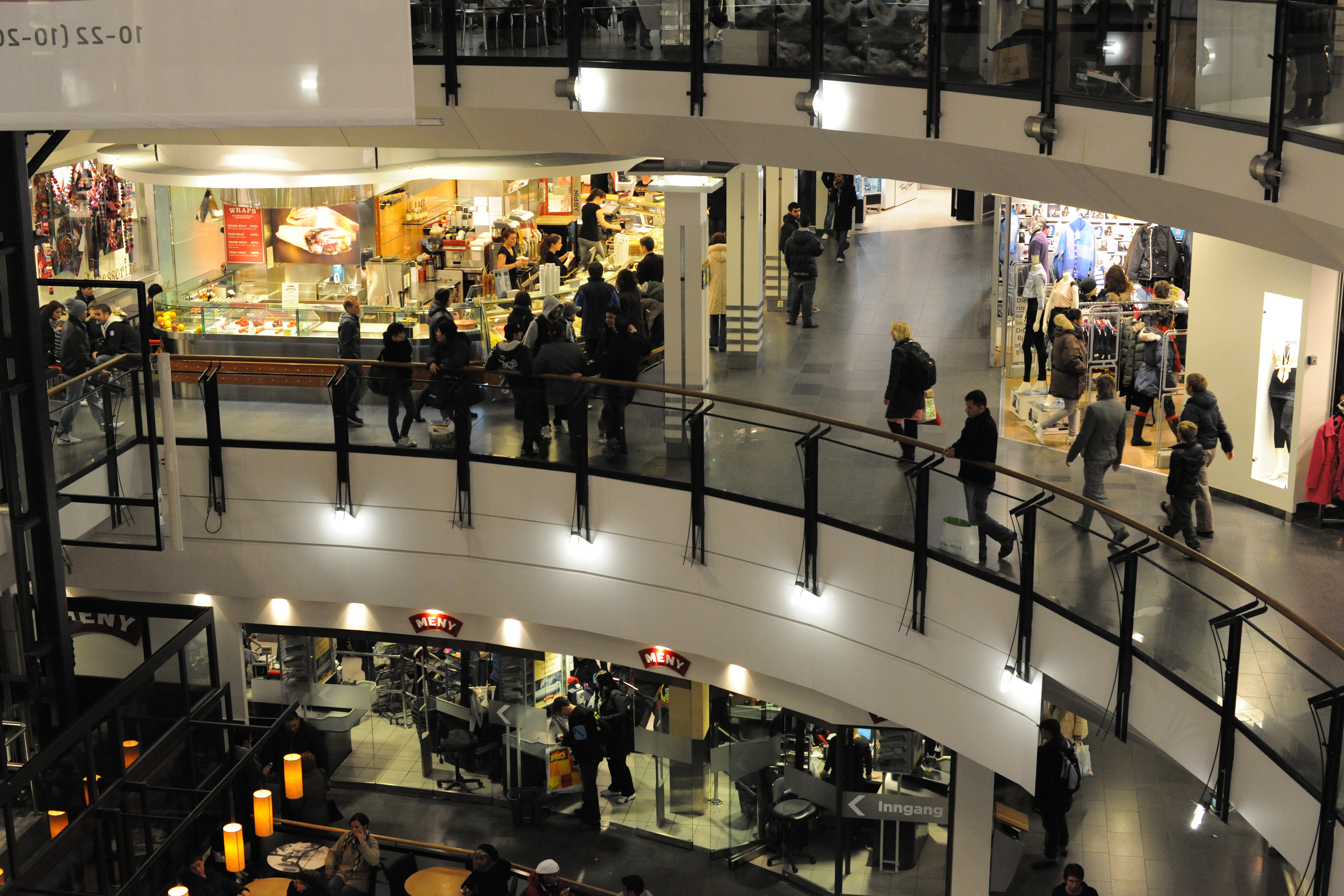
Oslo City interior

Oslo City is one of the largest shopping centres in central Oslo, Norway. The shopping centre was built in 1988, and is visited by c. 50,000 people a day – 16 million a year. It generated gross revenues of 1,444 billion Norwegian kroner in 2005. It has 26,000 m² of commercial space, with 93 stores on five floors.
