= Tomb of Tự Đức =

Royal tomb of the Nguyễn dynasty in Vietnam

Coordinates: 16.4325°N 107.5660°E

- Tự Đức Lăng (嗣德陵)
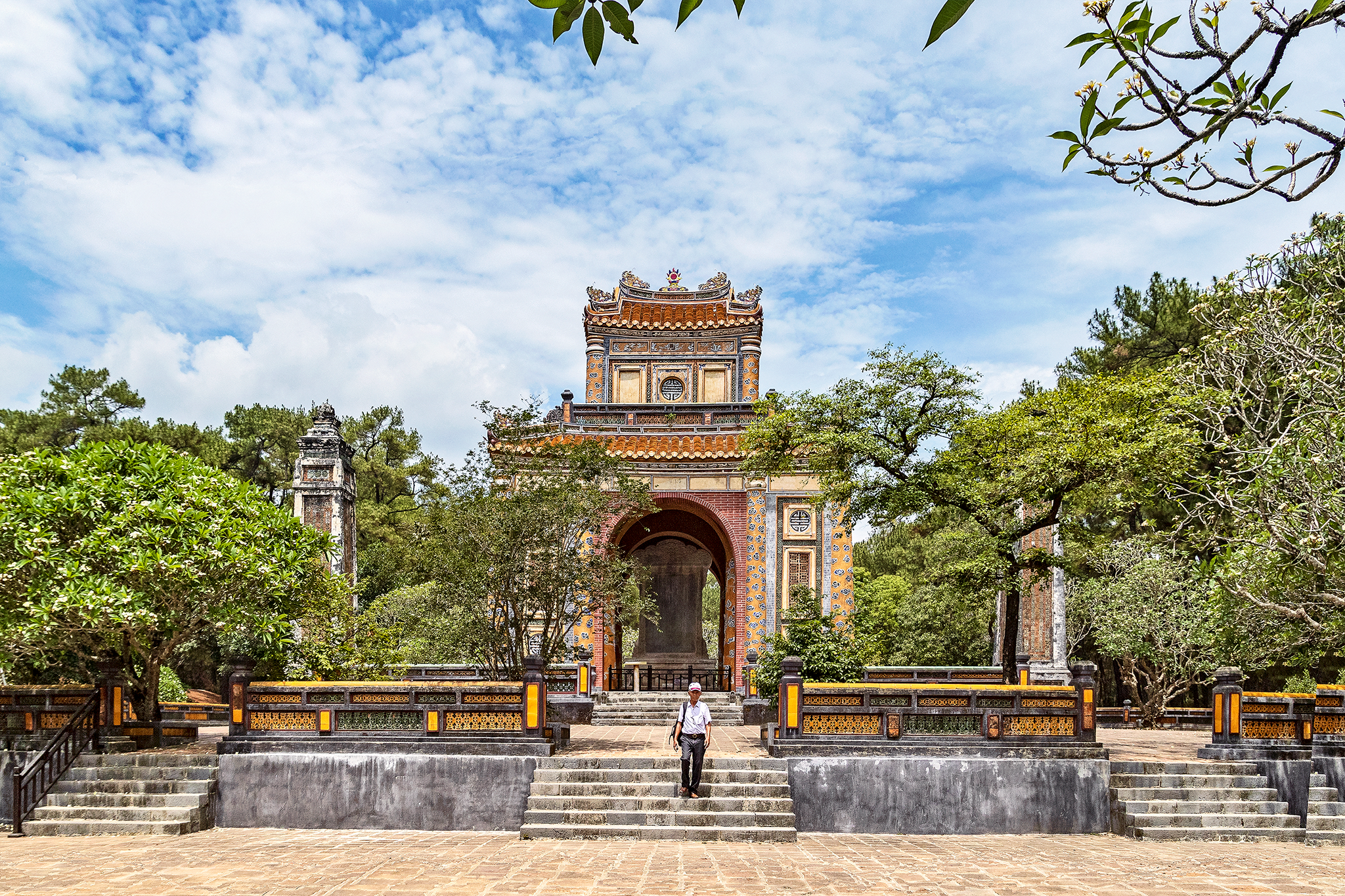
- Khiêm Lăng

General information
- Architectural style: Vietnamese architecture, Mausoleum
- Location: The Complex of Huế Monuments, Huế, Huế City, Thừa Thiên Huế province, Vietnam
- Groundbreaking: 1866
- Construction started: 1864
- Completed: 1867

Tomb of Tự Đức (Vietnamese: Lăng Tự Đức), officially Khiêm Mausoleum (Khiêm Lăng, chữ Hán: 謙陵), is located in Huế, Vietnam. It was built for the Nguyễn Emperor Tự Đức and took three years to build, from 1864 to 1867. It is divided into a Temple Area and a Tomb Area.

== History ==
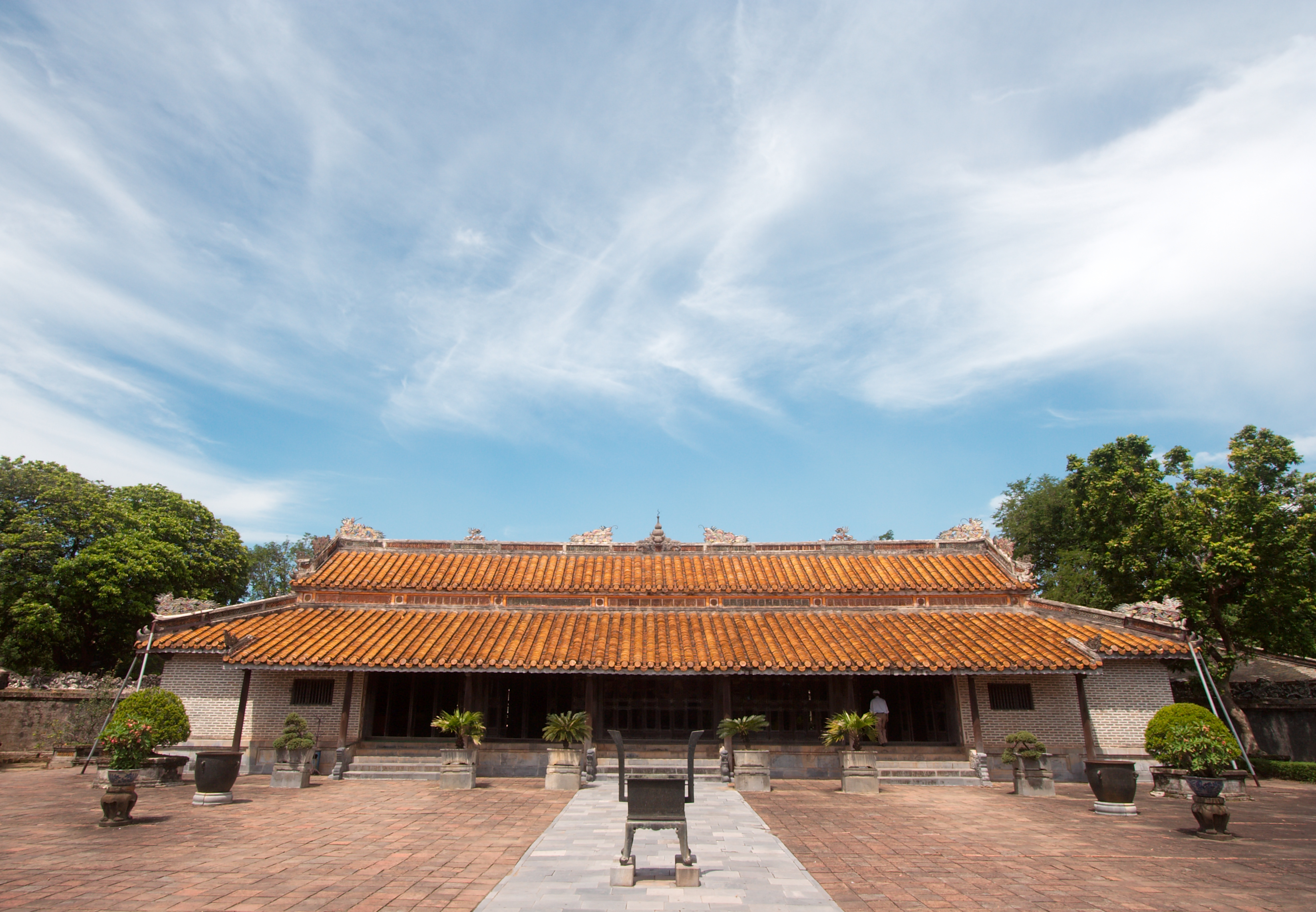
Hòa Khiêm hall, the main shrine to worship emperor Tự Đức.

Emperor Tu Duc enjoyed the longest reign of any monarch of the Nguyễn dynasty, ruling from 1848 to 1883. Although he had 104 wives and concubines, he was unable to father a son (possibly he became sterile after contracting smallpox). Thus, it fell to him to write his own epitaph on the deeds of his reign. He felt this was a bad omen, but the epitaph can still be found inscribed on the stele in the pavilion just to the east of the Emperor's tomb. This stele is the largest of its type in Vietnam, and had to be brought here from a quarry over 500 kilometers (310 mi) away – a trip that took four years.

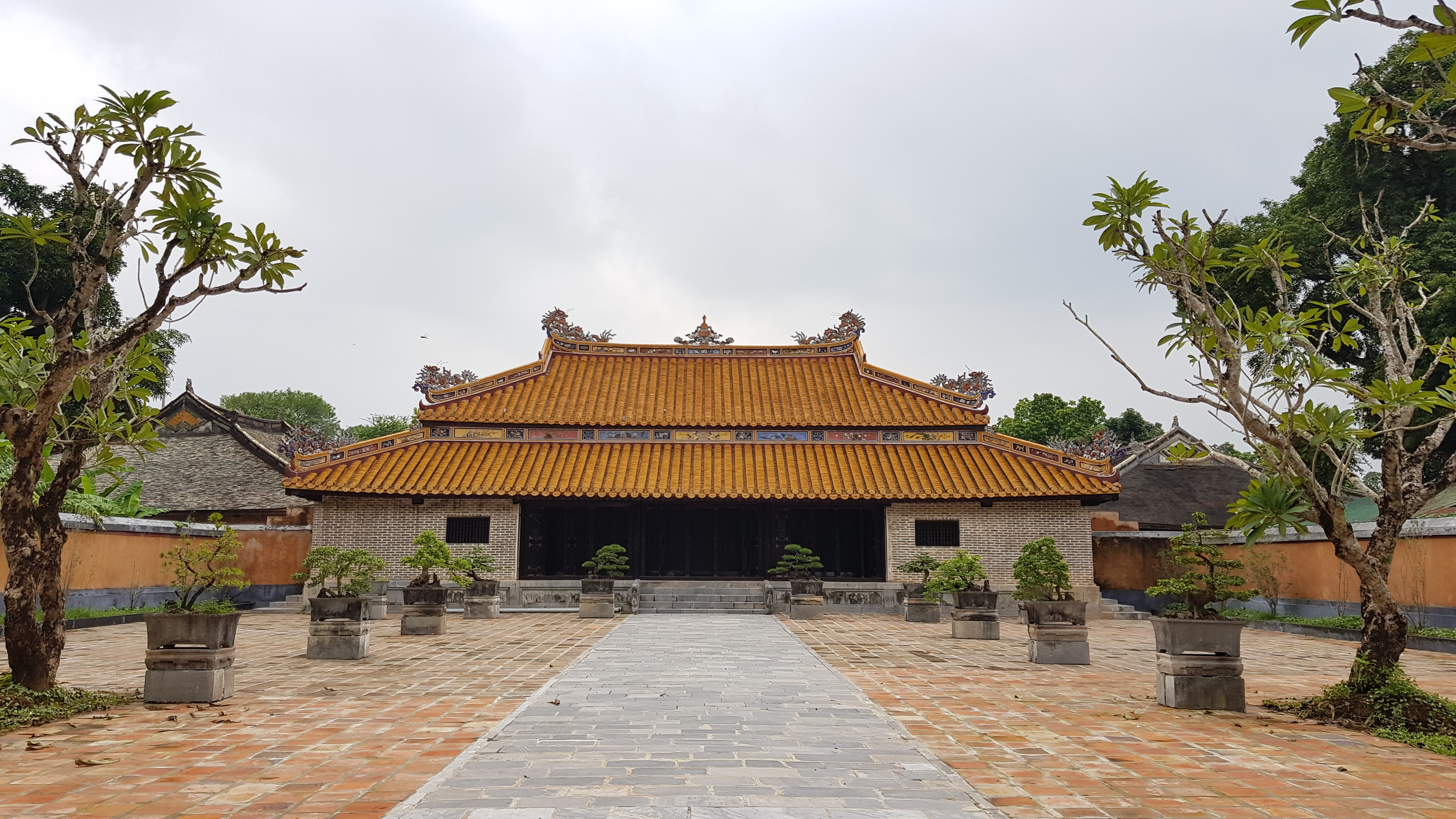
Lương Khiêm hall (良謙殿) in Tự Đức tomb, the place to worship empress dowager Từ Dụ.

Tu Duc began planning his tomb long before his death in 1883. The major portions of the tomb complex were completed from 1864 to 1867, along with future temple buildings that served as a palatial retreat for Tu Duc and his many wives during his lifetime. Construction of the tomb demanded so much corvee labor and extra taxation that there was an abortive coup against Tu Duc in 1866. This was put down, and for the remainder of his life, Tu Duc continued to use the tomb's palace buildings as his place of residence.

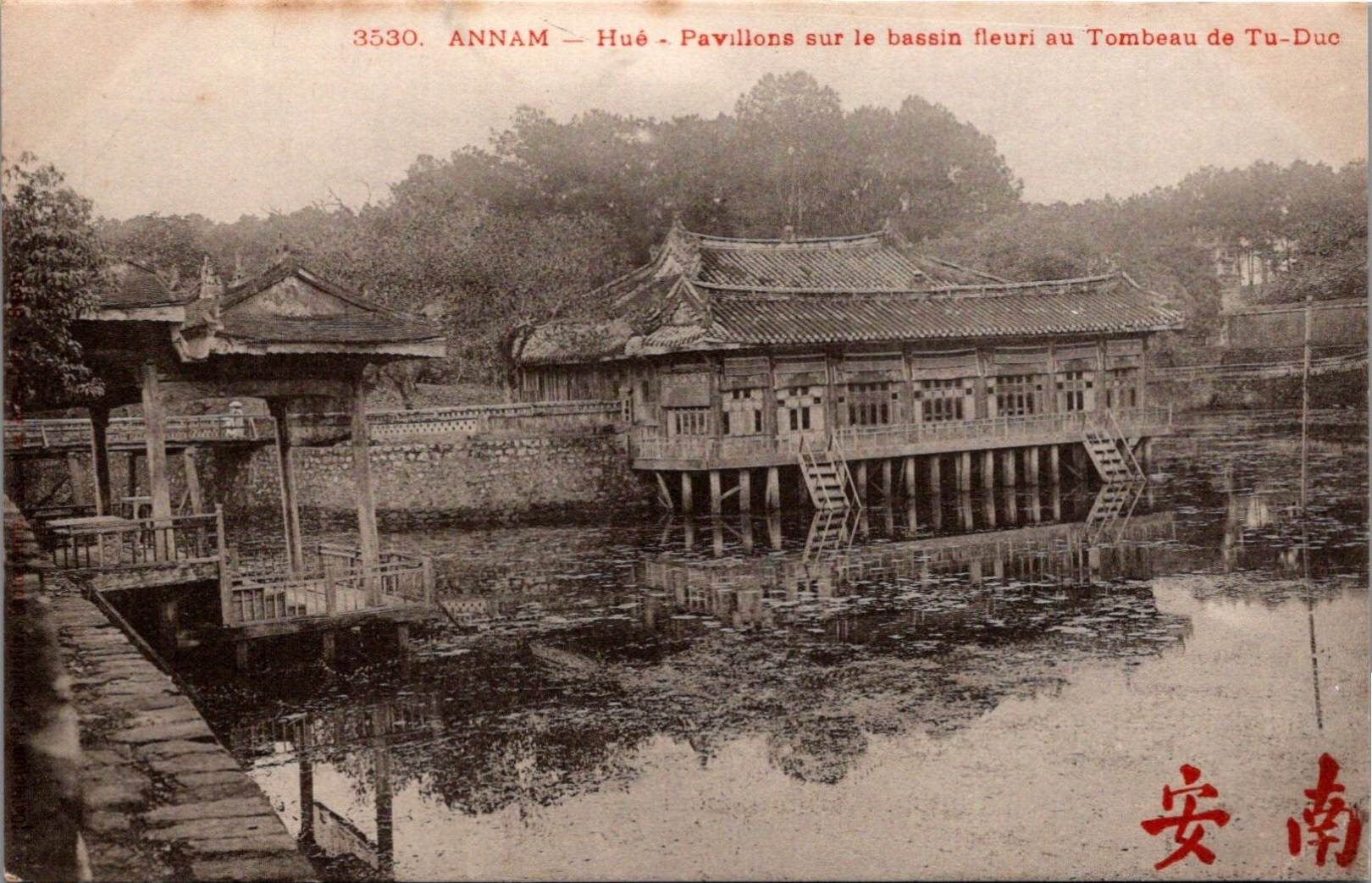
Xung Khiêm Tạ (冲謙榭) pavilion.

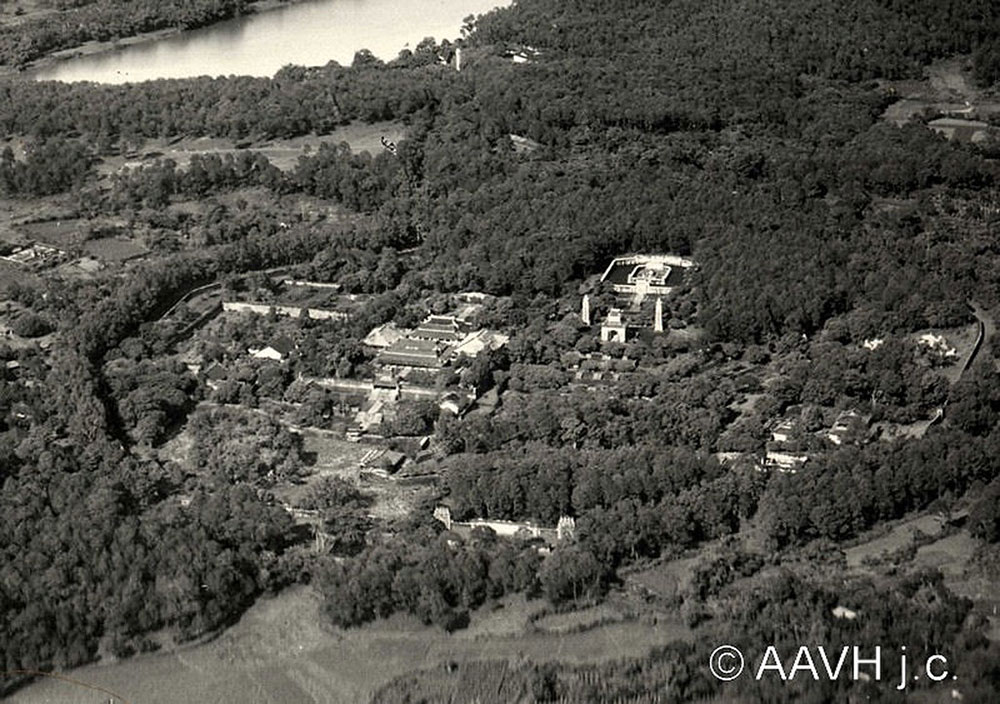
Bird-eye view of the tomb in 1932

Amenities for the living are unmatched at any other tomb in Vietnam. Here, the Emperor could boat on the lake and hunt small game on the tiny island in the lake's middle. He could recline at Xung Khiem Pavilion (冲嗛榭) and recite or compose poetry in the company of his concubines. After trips on the lake, the boats would moor at Du Khiem Pavilion (吁嗛榭), from which the Emperor and his entourage could walk directly west into the palace area of the tomb.

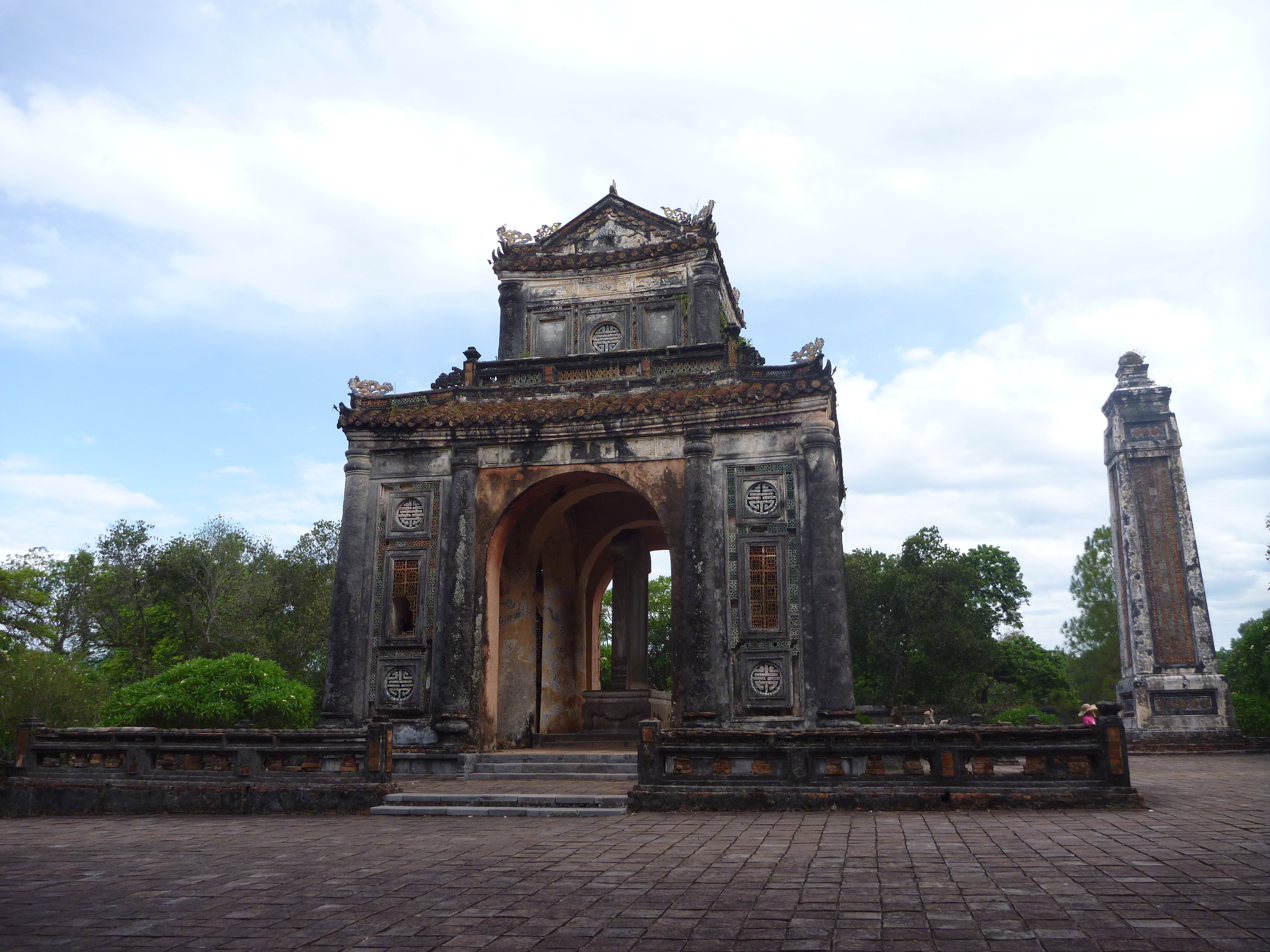
Tomb of Emperor Tự Đức

After the Emperor's death in 1883, his adopted son Kien Phuc took over as the Nguyen Emperor. Perhaps because he only ruled seven months before dying, a separate tomb was not established for him. Instead, he was laid to rest in a small corner on the grounds of Tu Duc's tomb. Between the tombs of Tu Duc and his son is the tomb of Empress Le Thien Anh, Tu Duc's primary wife.

Despite the grandeur of the site and the amount of time Tu Duc spent here, he was buried in a different, secret location. To this day, the real tomb of Tu Duc remains hidden.

== Gallery ==
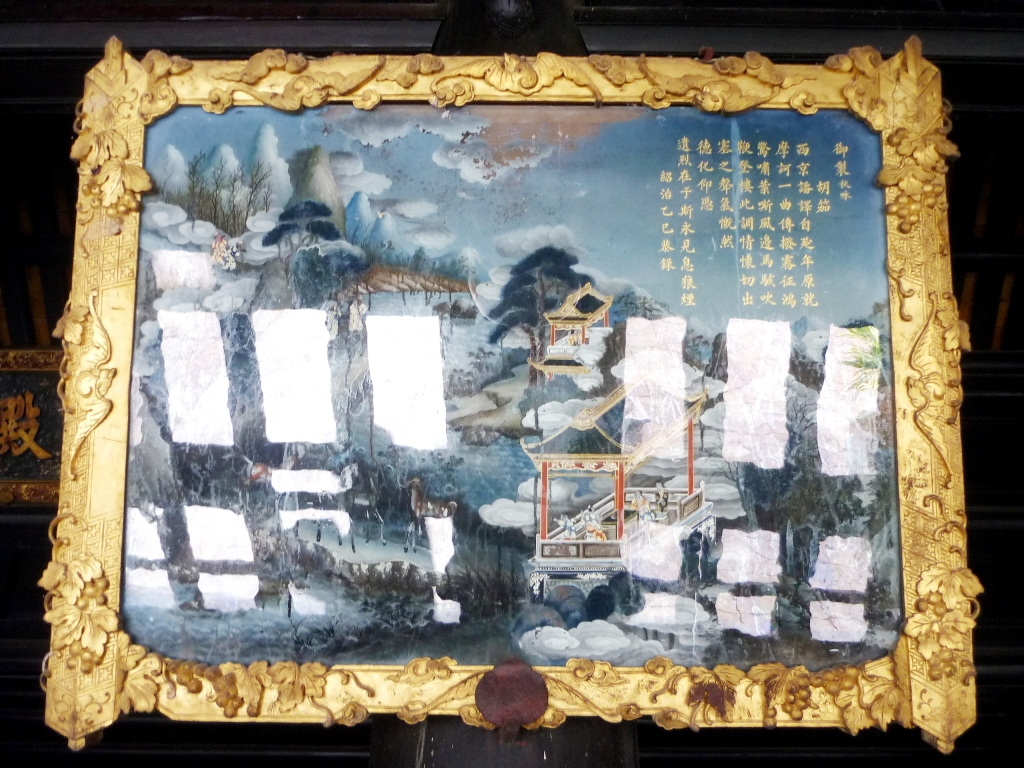
Reverse painting in Lương Khiêm Palace

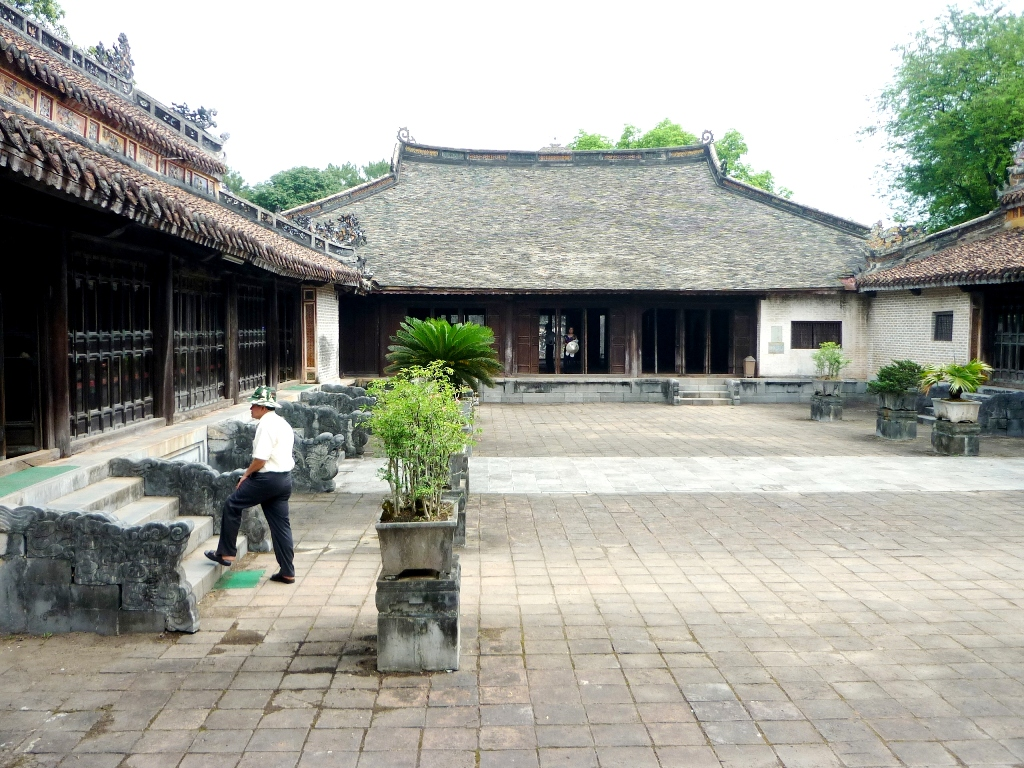
Minh Khiêm Theater

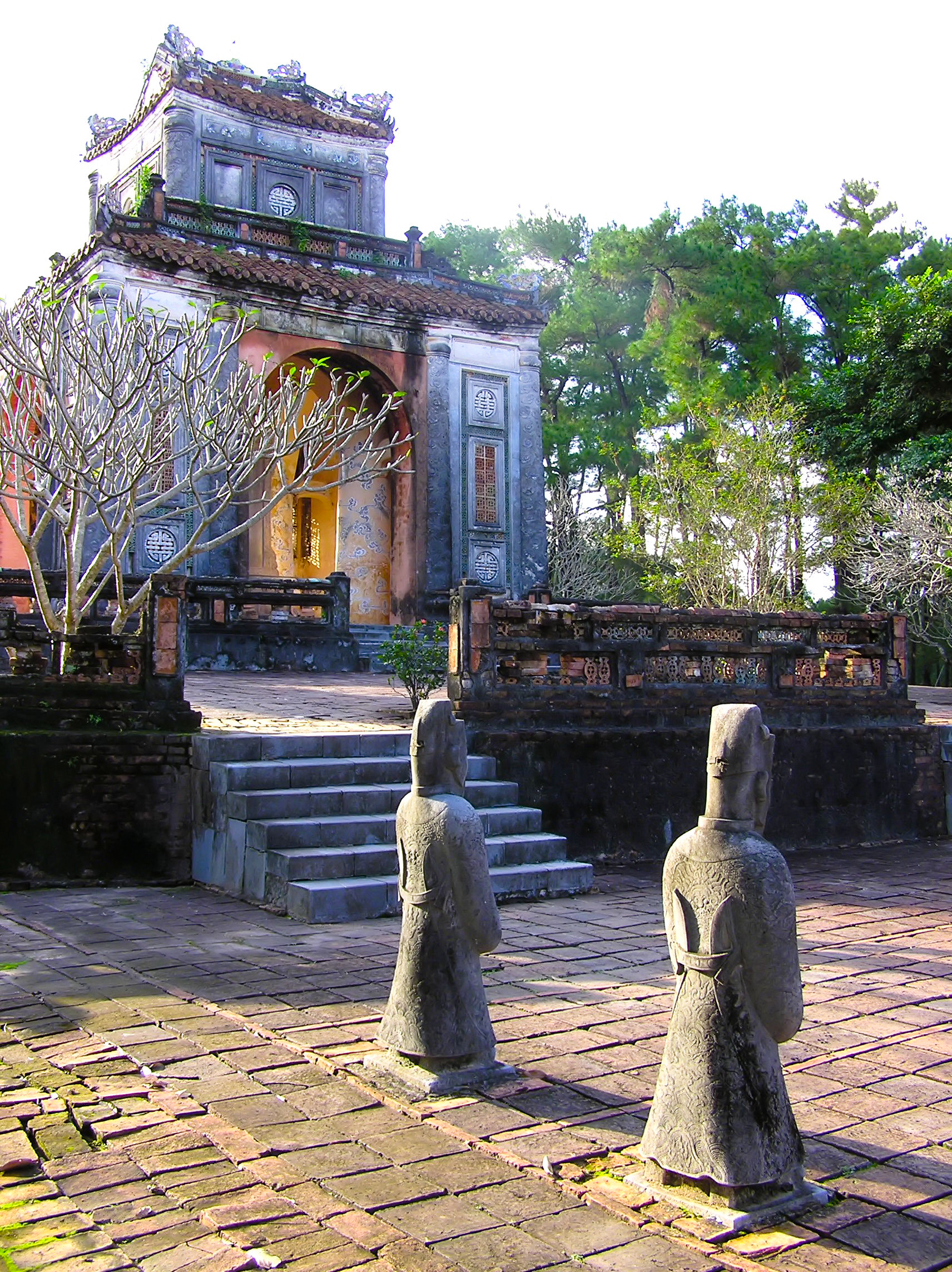
Statue of a mandarin

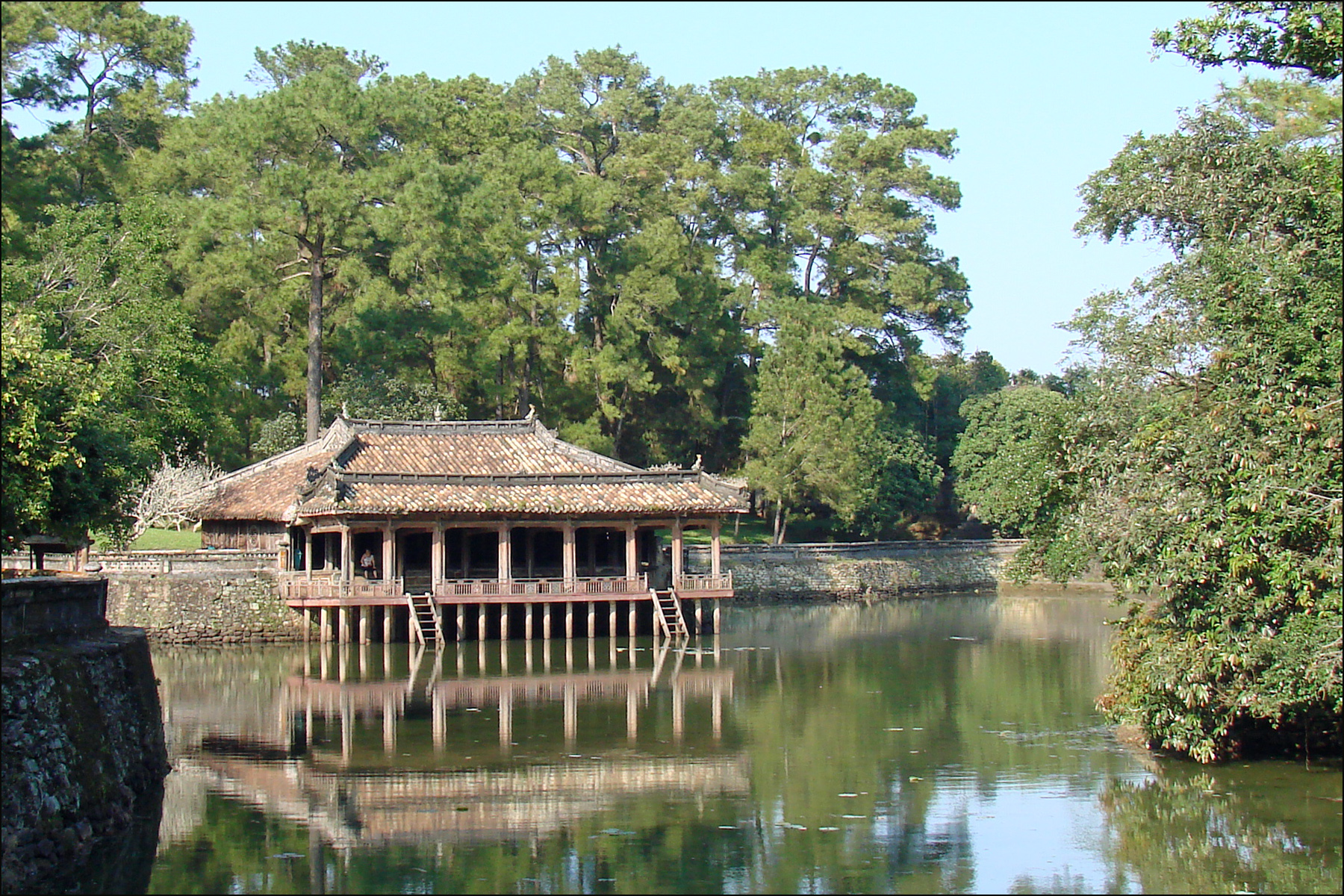
Xung Khiêm tạ (冲謙榭) before restoration.

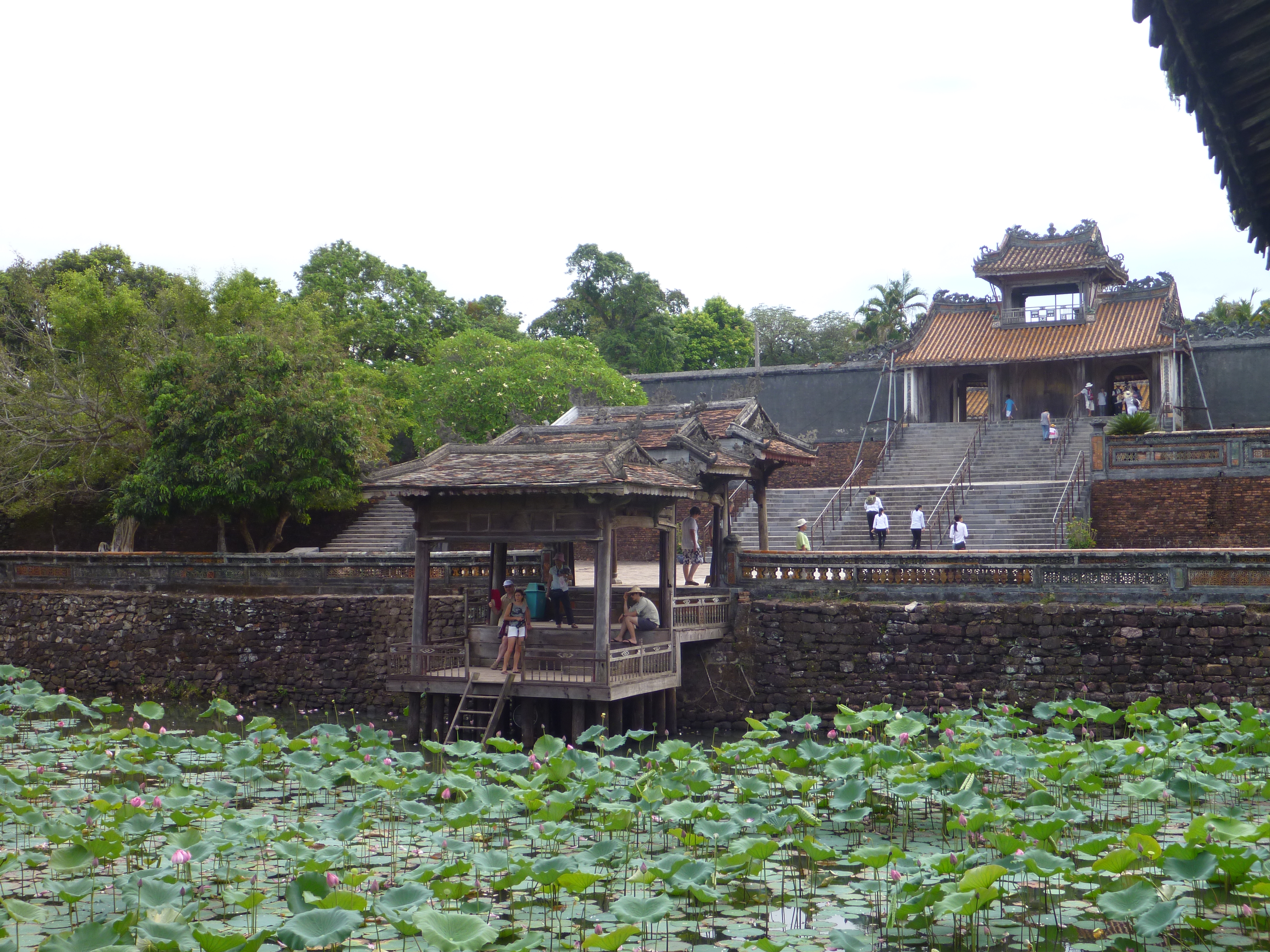
Dũ Khiêm tạ (俞謙榭) and Khiêm Cung môn (謙宫門).

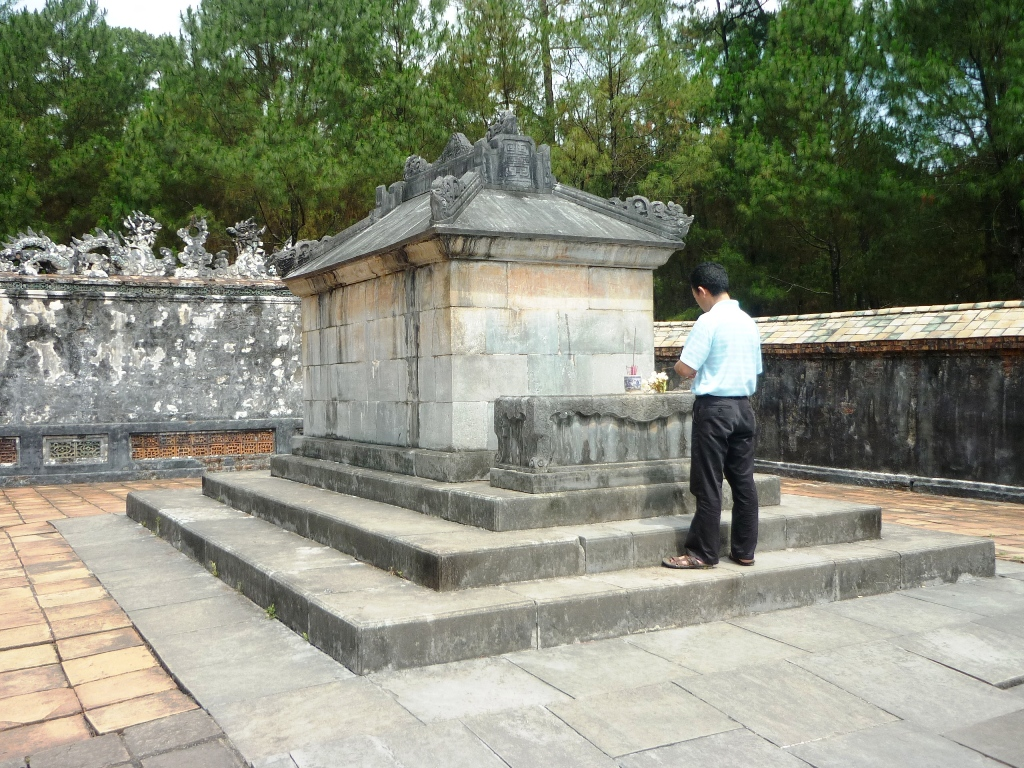
Tự Đức's reliquary.

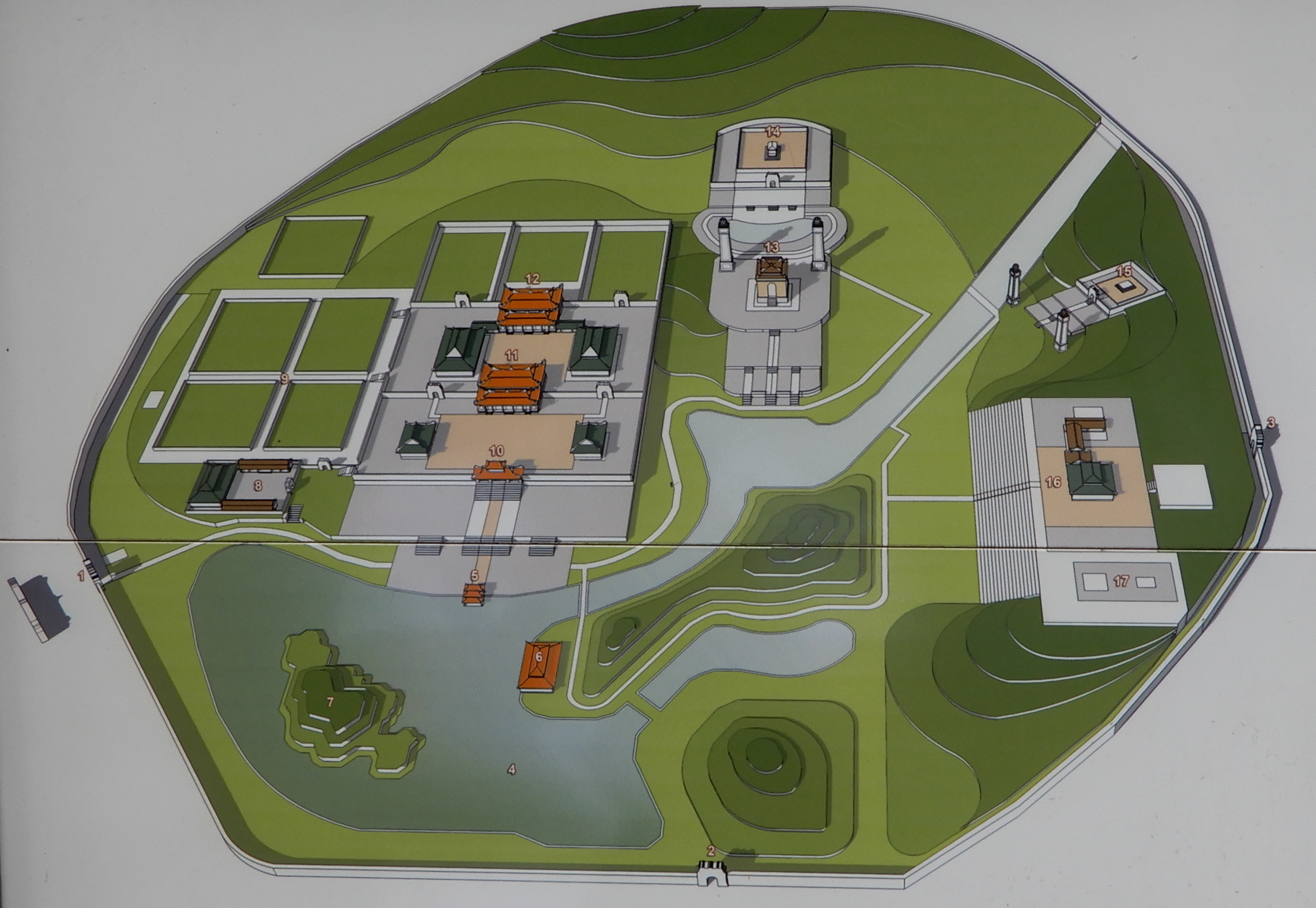
Khiêm Lăng map
