= Stanley Market =

Street market in Hong Kong

Coordinates: 22.2188°N 114.2120°E

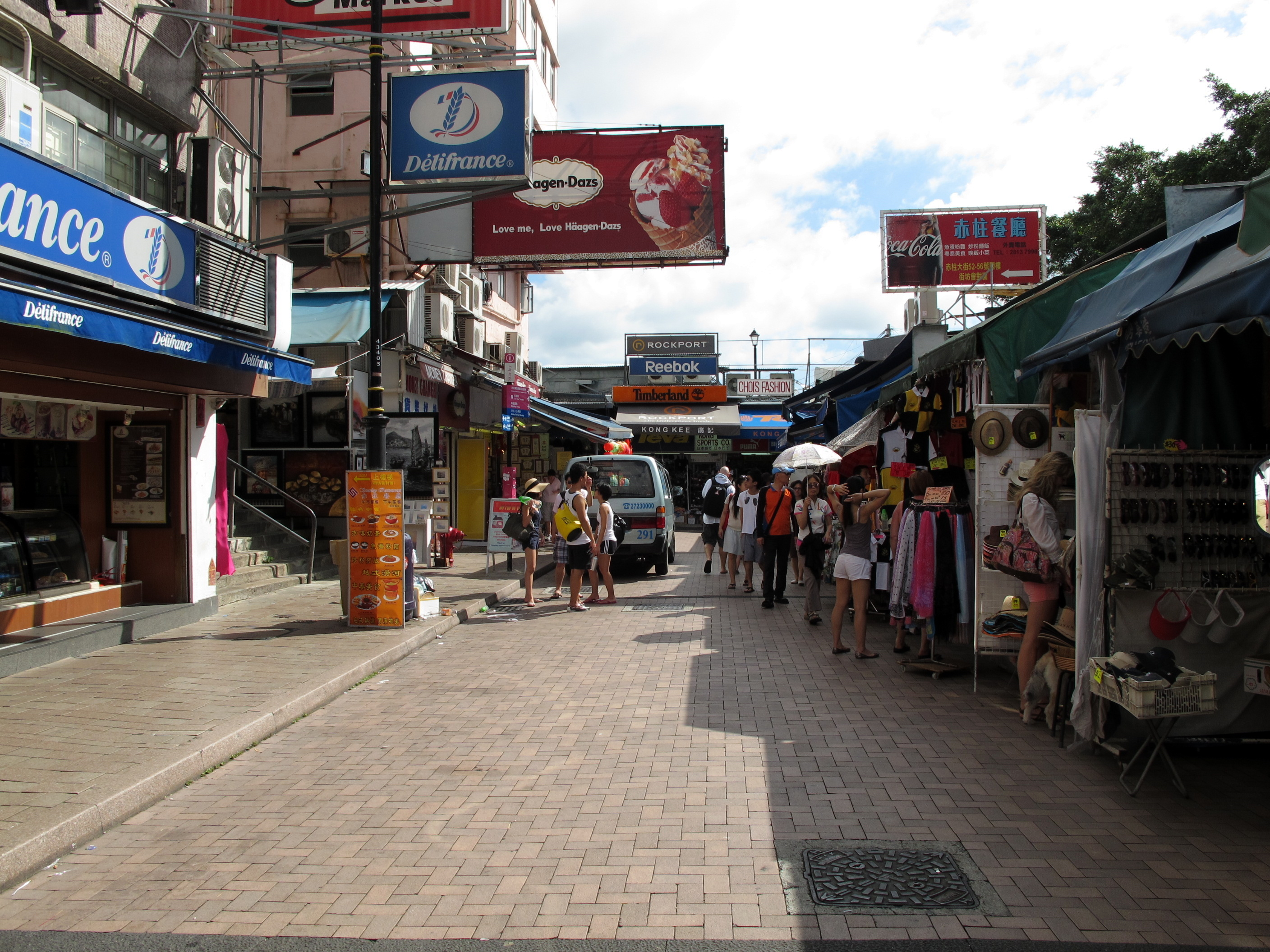
Stanley Market

Stanley Market (Chinese: 赤柱市集; pinyin: Chì Zhù Shìjí; Jyutping: cek3 cyu5 si5 zaap6) is a street market in Stanley on Hong Kong Island, Hong Kong. The street is a typical example of a traditional old open-air market in Hong Kong and has since become a major tourist attraction, well known for its bargains. Many of the stalls or shops in Stanley Market sell Hong Kong souvenirs as well as clothing - particularly silk garments and traditional Chinese dress - toys, ornaments, luggage, souvenirs, paintings, and Chinese arts and crafts. The market grew out of Chek Chu Tsuen, a nearby village.

There are several small Chinese restaurants in the marketplace and a small old dai pai dong or open food stall. There are also a variety of restaurants along the seafront.

The nearby Stanley Main Street offers many larger restaurants, both Western and Chinese.
