= Lenin Park (Hanoi) =

Park in Hanoi, Vietnam

- Công viên Lê-nin
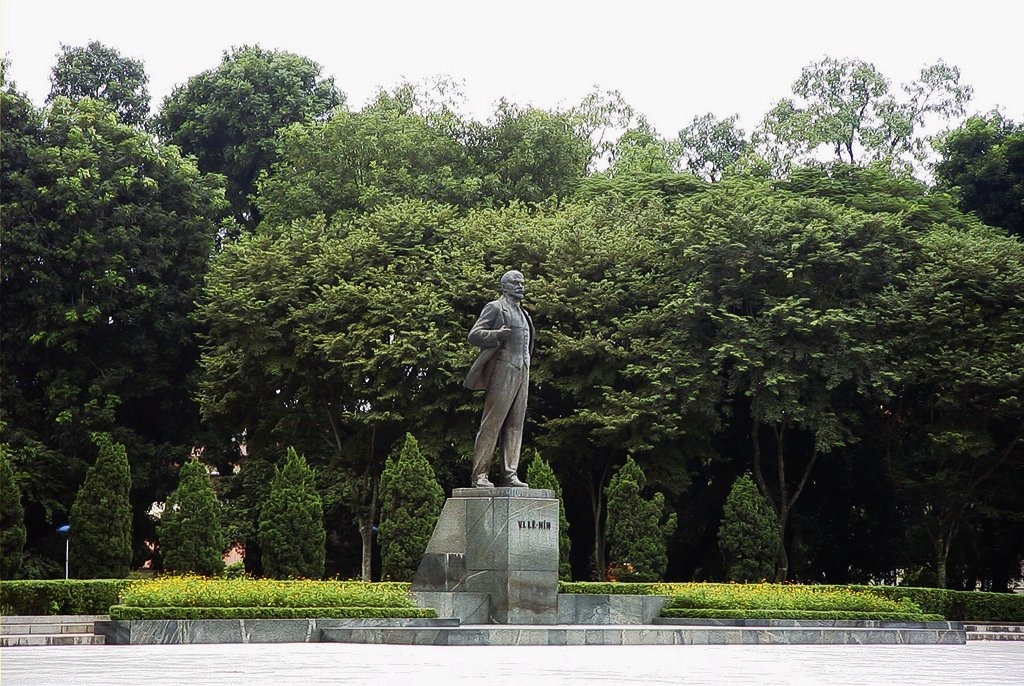
- Interactive map of Lenin Park
- Coordinates: 21.031685°N 105.839415°E
- Area: about 17,000 square metres (180,000 ft^{2})

Lenin Park (Vietnamese: Công viên Lê-nin), formerly known as Chi Lăng Flower Garden, is a park in Hanoi, Vietnam, named after Vladimir Lenin. It lies across from the Vietnam Military History Museum and is surrounded by the streets of Điện Biên Phủ, Trần Phú, and Hoàng Diệu. The park's shape is triangular and has a total area of 17,183 m², including the Lenin monumental complex.

== History ==
Before the park was established, there was a lake in its place called Elephant Lake (Hồ Voi) because it is said that soldiers used to bathe elephants there. Between 1894 and 1897, the French colonial government filled up Elephant Lake and constructed a park named Robin Flower Garden. Hanoi citizens back then often called the park "Farming Scenery Flower Garden" (vườn hoa Canh Nông) instead because there was a statue of a farmer plowing with a water buffalo.

After the Japanese coup d'etat against the French colonial government in March 1945, the newly-appointed mayor of Hanoi, Trần Văn Lai, tore down French colonial-era monuments and renamed streets and places. The monuments in Robin Flower Garden were also demolished, and the park was renamed "Chi Lăng Flower Garden" (vườn hoa Chi Lăng) in dedication to the Vietnamese victory in the Battle of Chi Lăng. The park retained this name even after the takeover of Hanoi by the Communist Party of Vietnam.

In 1982, the government decided to build a Lenin monument in the park. The 5.2-meter-tall bronze statue was created with the help of the Soviet Union. On August 20, 1985, the Lenin statue was officially erected.

On October 7, 2003, Chi Lăng Flower Garden was renamed Lenin Park. From 1980 until 2003, Thong Nhat Park was known as Lenin Park. After October 7, 2003, Thong Nhat Park reverted to its original name.

== Gallery ==
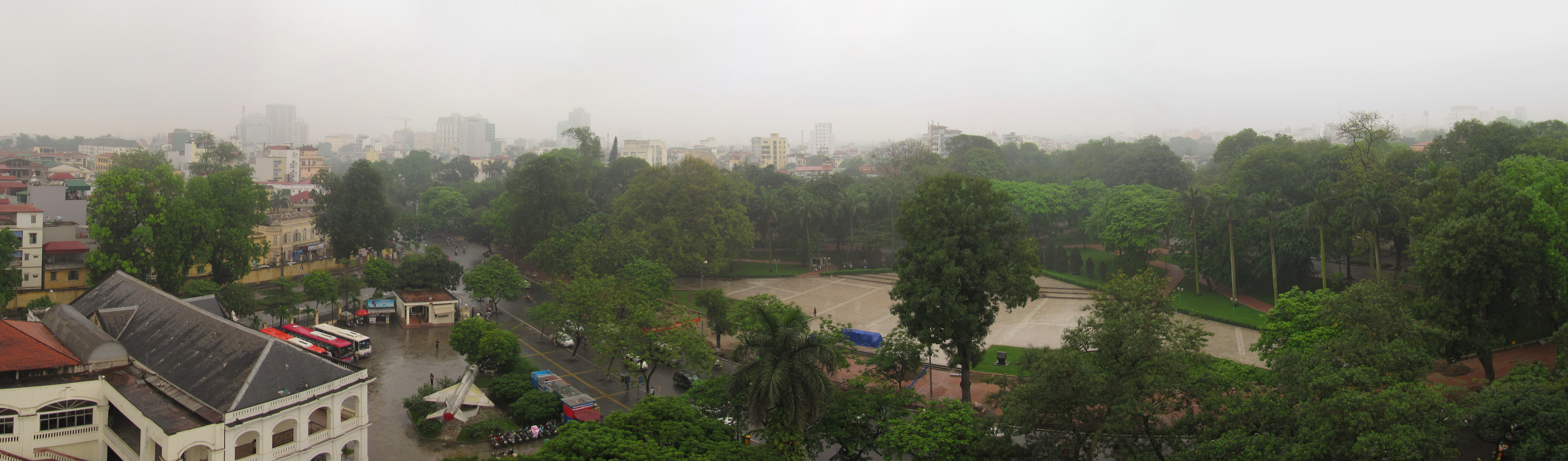
Lenin Park viewed from the Flag Tower of Hanoi

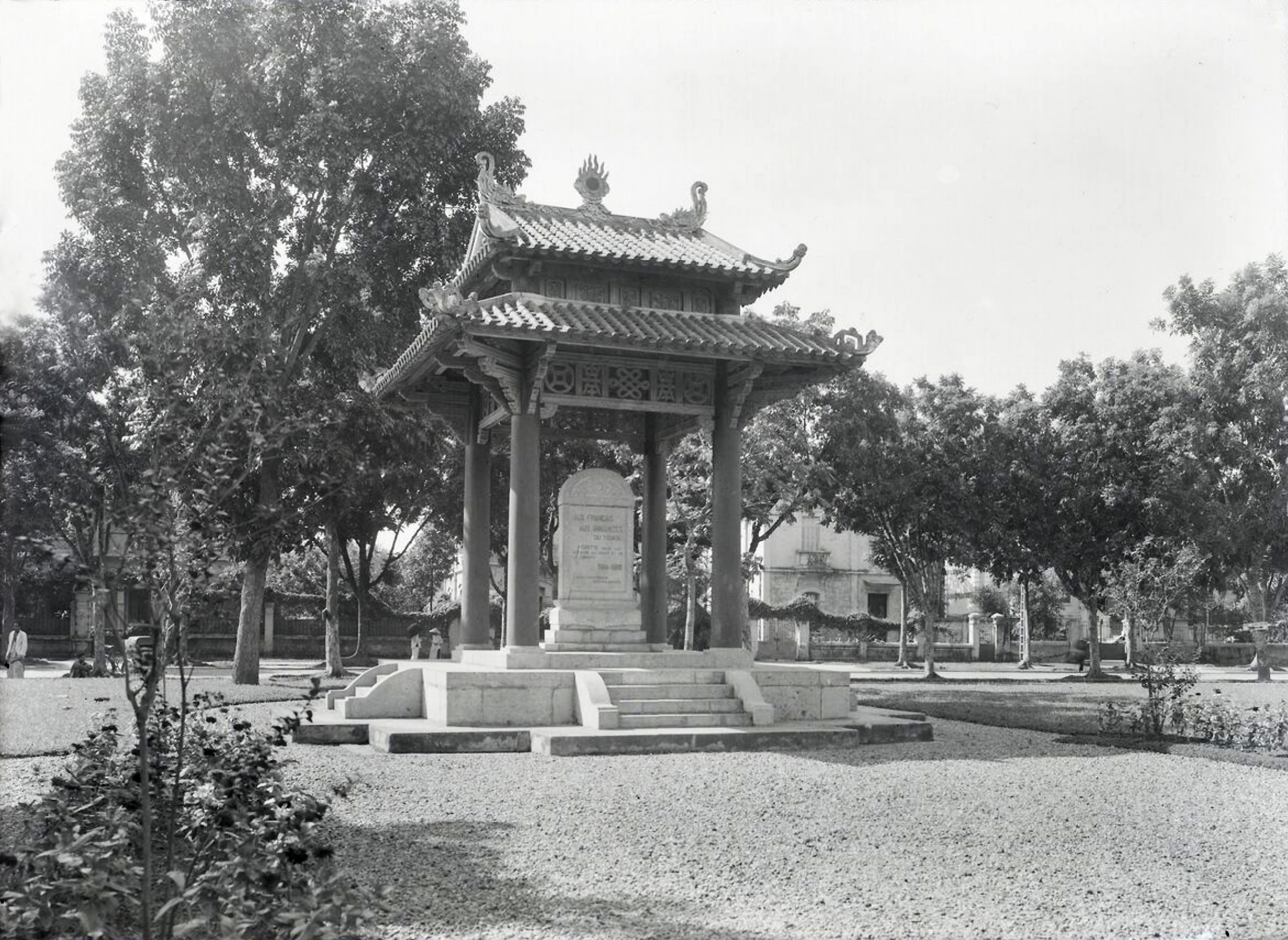
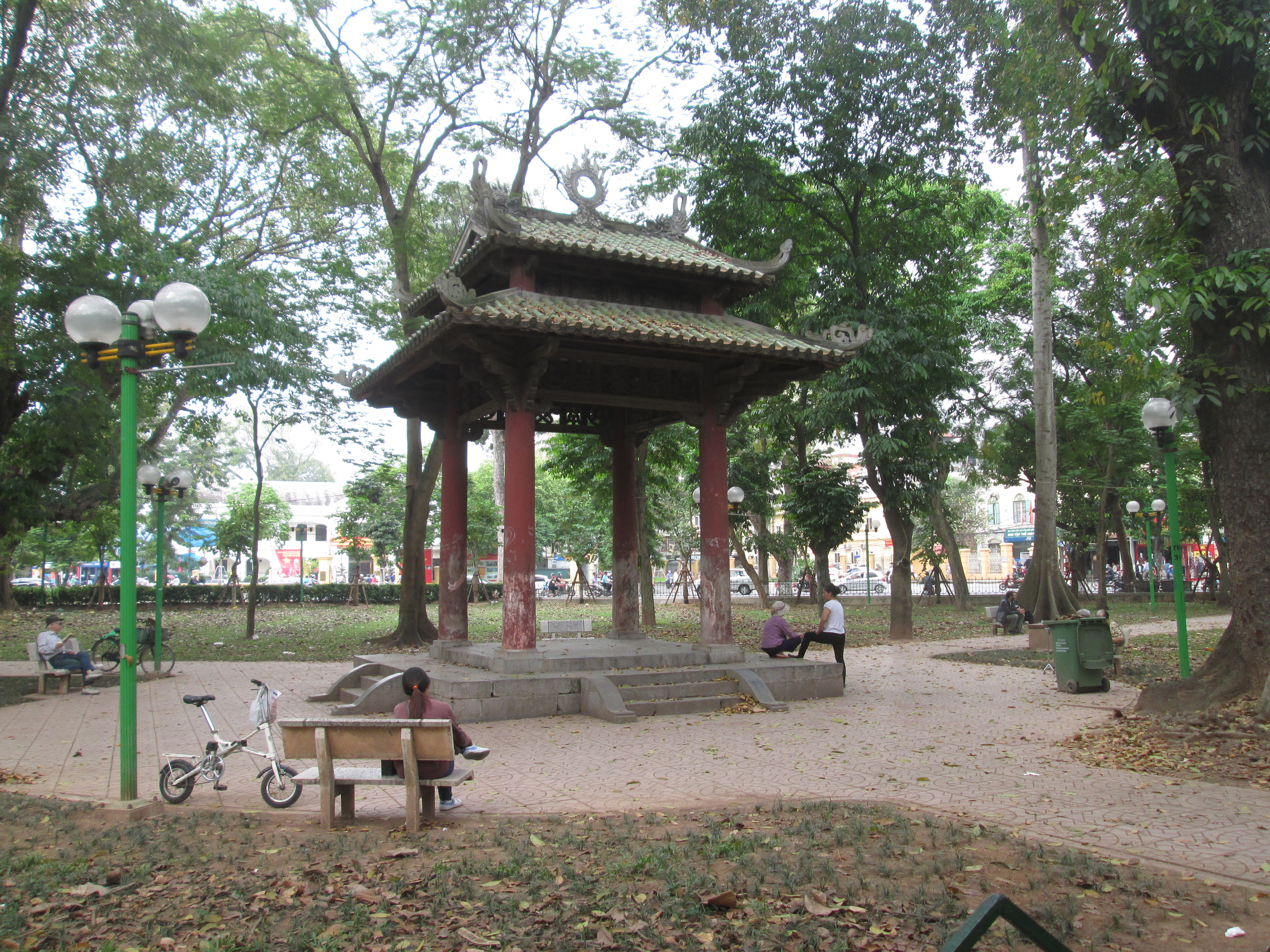
There was a stele commemorating the soldiers who died in World War I. Photos were taken during the French colonial era (first) and today (second).
