= Kính Thiên Palace =

- Điện Kính Thiên
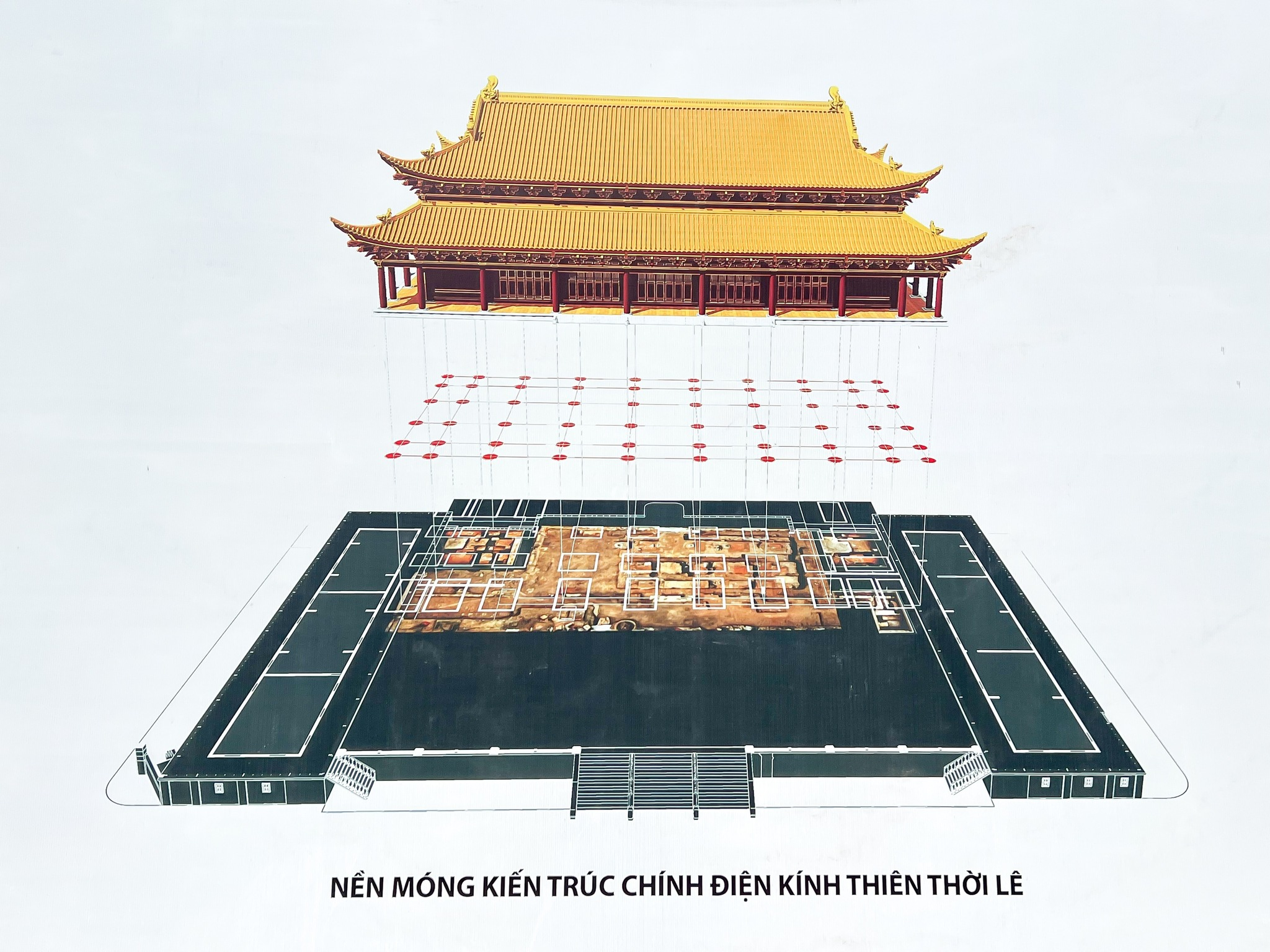
- The model of the throne hall
- Interactive map of the Kính Thiên Palace area

General information
- Type: Hall
- Location: Imperial Citadel of Thăng Long, Hanoi, Vietnam
- Coordinates: 21°02′16″N 105°50′28″E
- Completed: 1428; 598 years ago
- Renovated: 1816
- Destroyed: 1886

The Kính Thiên hall (Vietnamese: Điện Kính Thiên; chữ Hán: 敬天殿) was the throne hall built as the central structure of the imperial palace complex of the Later Lê dynasty, located in its capital Đông Kinh (present-day Hanoi). The palace hall was renamed Long Thiên Palace (Vietnamese: Điện Long Thiên; chữ Hán: 隆天殿) in 1841 during the reign of Emperor Thiệu Trị of the Nguyễn dynasty.

== Location ==
The Kính Thiên Palace was built in the heart of the Imperial Citadel, on the exact spot where the Thiên An Palace of the Lý dynasty once stood, on the peak of Nùng Mountain. On its right stood the Chí Kinh Palace, and on its left, the Vạn Thọ Palace. Directly facing it was the Thị Triều Palace, where monthly court audiences were held. In front of the Thị Triều Palace was the Đoan Môn Gate.

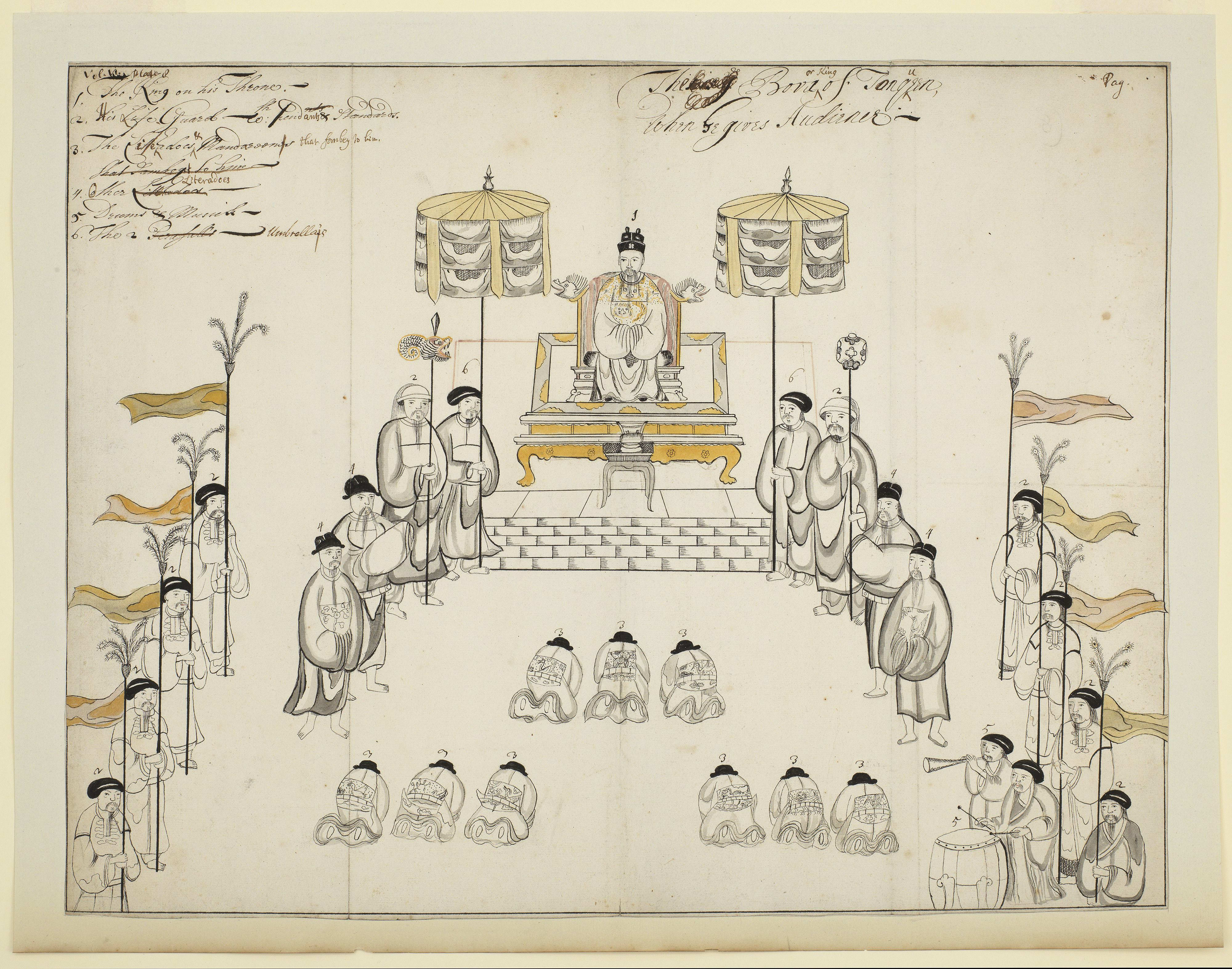
Emperor Lê Hy Tông held the court ceremony at throne hall in 1684.

== History ==
According to the Đại Việt sử ký toàn thư (Complete Annals of Đại Việt), the Kính Thiên Palace was initially constructed in 1428 during the reign of Lê Thái Tổ. Its completion occurred during the reign of Lê Thánh Tông. The Kính Thiên Palace served as the location where Lê Thái Tổ proclaimed his ascension to the throne in 1428. It subsequently became the venue for significant court rituals, the reception of foreign emissaries, imperial conferences convened to deliberate on matters of state, and the performance of sacrifices.

In 1816, Emperor Gia Long of the Nguyễn dynasty ordered the reconstruction of this palace. It was later used as a temporary imperial residence by successive Nguyễn dynasty emperors during their journeys northward. In 1841, Emperor Thiệu Trị renamed the palace as the Long Thiên Palace.

In 1886, the palace was destroyed by French colonial authorities to make way for an artillery command center. Today, only the steps and foundation of the palace remain, located within the present-day Hanoi Old Quarter.

== See also ==
- Imperial Citadel of Thăng Long
