= Flag Tower of Hanoi =

Tower in Hanoi, Vietnam

Coordinates: 21°1′57″N 105°50′23″E

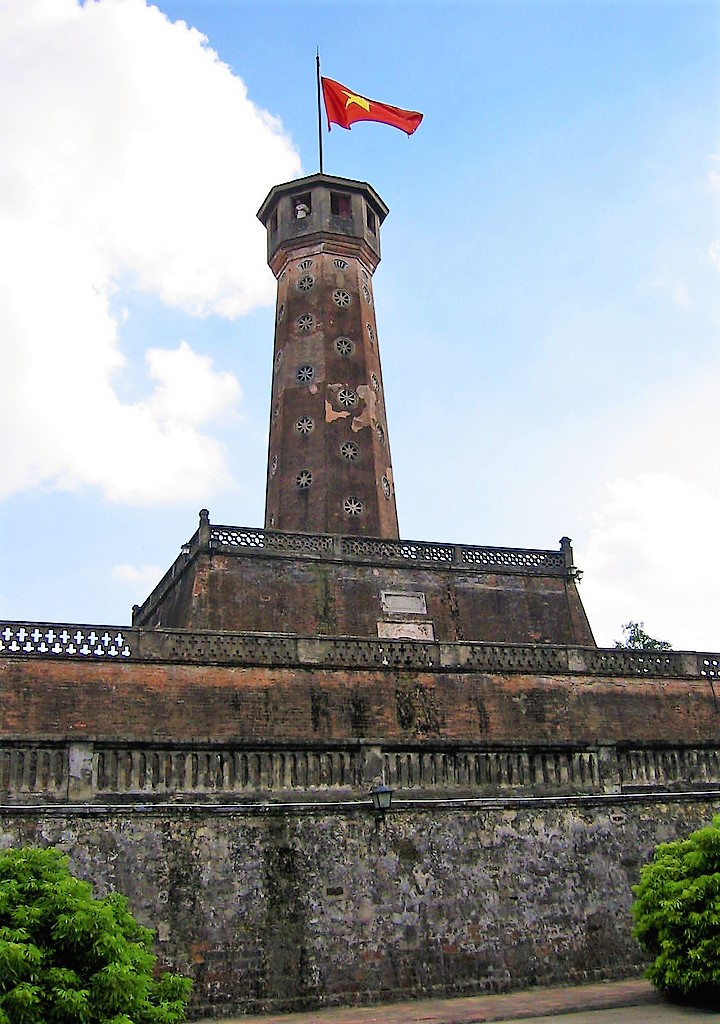
Flag Tower of Hanoi

Map

The Flag Tower of Hanoi (Vietnamese: Cột cờ Hà Nội) is a tower in Hanoi, Vietnam, which is one of the symbols of the city and once a part of the Hanoi Citadel, a World Heritage Site. Its height is 33.4 m (41 m with the flag).

== History ==
The tower is considered to have been built in 1805 or 1812 during the Nguyen dynasty as an observation post to the Hanoi Citadel. Unlike many other structures in Hanoi, it was not destroyed during the French invasion (1896-1897), and was continuously used as a military post. From 1956 to 2024, the Hanoi Flag Tower was located within the grounds of the Vietnam Military History Museum (formerly the Military Museum), and now belongs to the Imperial Citadel of Thang Long, situated on Dien Bien Phu Street, Ba Dinh District.

== Architecture ==
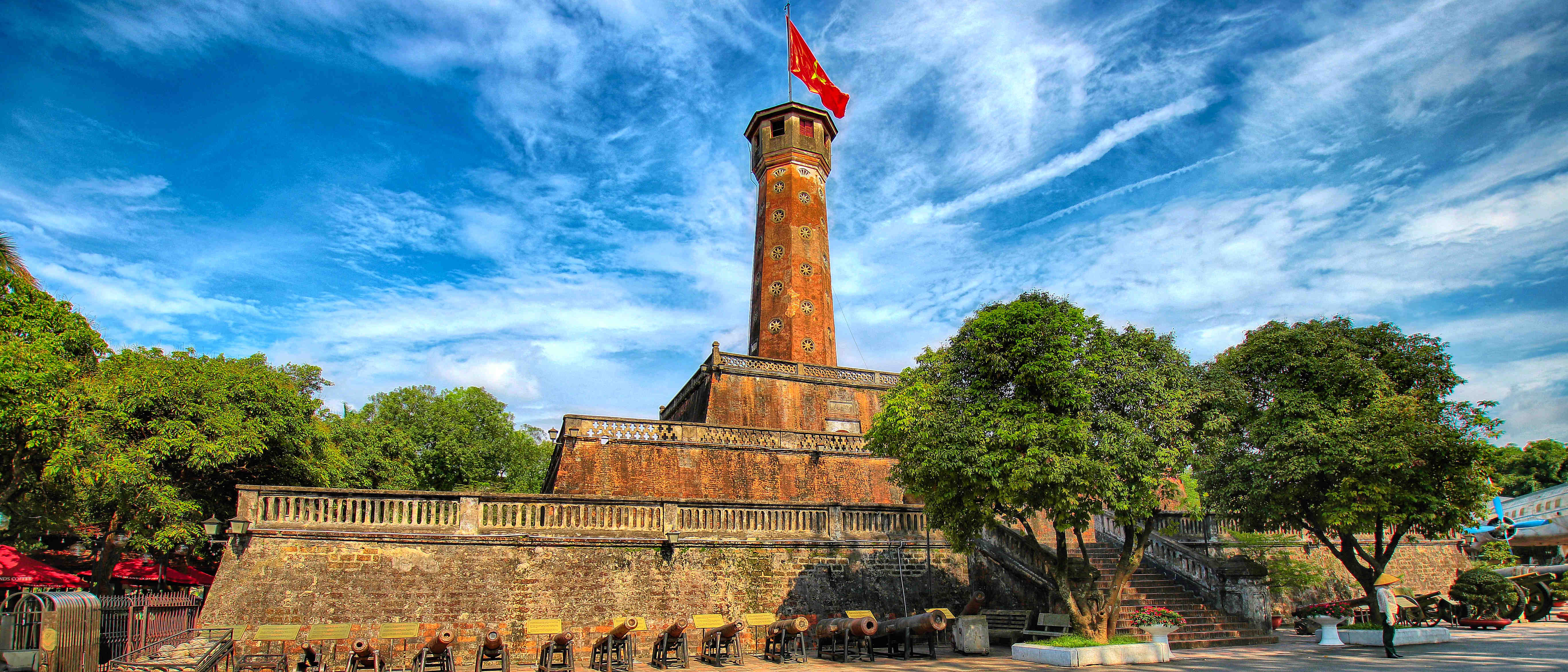
Flag Tower of Hanoi

Cột cờ is composed of three tiers and a pyramid-shaped tower with a spiral staircase leading to the top inside it. The first tier is 42.5 m wide and 3.1 m high; the second - 25 m wide and 3.7 m high and the third - 12.8 m wide and 5.1 m high. The second tier has four doors. The words "Nghênh Húc" (English: "To welcome dawn's sunlight") are inscribed on the eastern door; the words "Hồi Quang" ("To reflect light") - on the western door and "Hướng Minh" ("Directed to the sunlight") - on the southern door. The tower is lighted by 36 flower-shaped and 6 fan-shaped windows. The National Flag of Vietnam is on top of the tower.

== See also ==
- Tower of Hanoi
