= Imperial Citadel of Thăng Long =

Historic complex of buildings in Hanoi, Vietnam

Central Sector of the Imperial Citadel of Thăng Long – Hanoi
UNESCO World Heritage Site
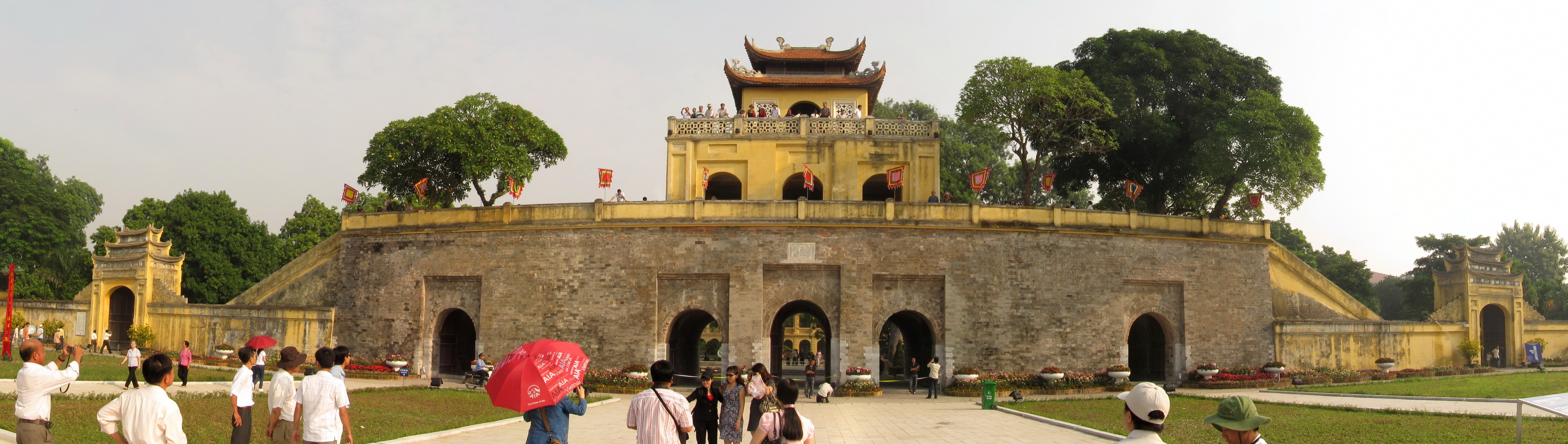
- Đoan Môn (端門), the main gate to the palatial complex of Later Lê Emperors.

- Location within Vietnam
- Location: Hanoi, Vietnam
- Criteria: Cultural: (ii), (iii), (vi)
- Reference: 1328
- Inscription: 2010 (34th Session)
- Area: 18.395 ha (45.46 acres)
- Buffer zone: 108 ha (270 acres)
- Coordinates: 21°2′22″N 105°50′14″E

The Imperial Citadel of Thăng Long (Vietnamese: Hoàng thành Thăng Long; chữ Hán: 皇城昇龍) is a complex of historic buildings associated with the history of Vietnam located in the centre of Hanoi, Vietnam. Its construction began in 1010 and was completed in early 1011 under the reign of Emperor Lý Thái Tổ of the Lý dynasty. Most of the existing structure is dated to the extensive reconstruction of the old Imperial Citadel ordered by Gia Long in 1805, but the Citadel (except for the North Gate and the Flag Tower) was largely demolished by the French to allow more land for offices and barracks.

== History ==
=== Pre-Thăng Long period ===
During the early and middle Tang dynasty, modern Vietnam was administered as the Annan protectorate (Vietnamese: An Nam đô hộ phủ), with the seat of power located in Tong Binh (the area of modern Hanoi). In 866, after recapturing the protectorate from Nanzhao forces, Tang dynasty general Gao Pian re-established the protectorate as the Jinghaijun ordered the construction of the Đại La Citadel, which would later become the Imperial Citadel of Thăng Long.

The fall of the Tang dynasty brought about a period of turbulent independence in Vietnam called the Anarchy of the 12 Warlords, which ended after the creation of the Đại Việt monarchy. During Dinh dynasty, the Đại La Citadel served as an important military site for its use in defenses against Northern invasions and internal conflicts, though it would not be re-established as the center of power in An Nam until the Lý dynasty's rise to power in the early 11th century.

=== Lý–Trần period (11th–14th centuries) ===
The Vietnamese royal enclosure was first built in 1010, during the Lý dynasty, and subsequently expanded by subsequent dynasties. It remained the seat of the Vietnamese court until 1789, when the Tây Sơn dynasty chose to move the capital to Huế. The ruins of the older citadel structures roughly coincide with the present-day Hanoi Citadel area in the Ba Đình District of the city.

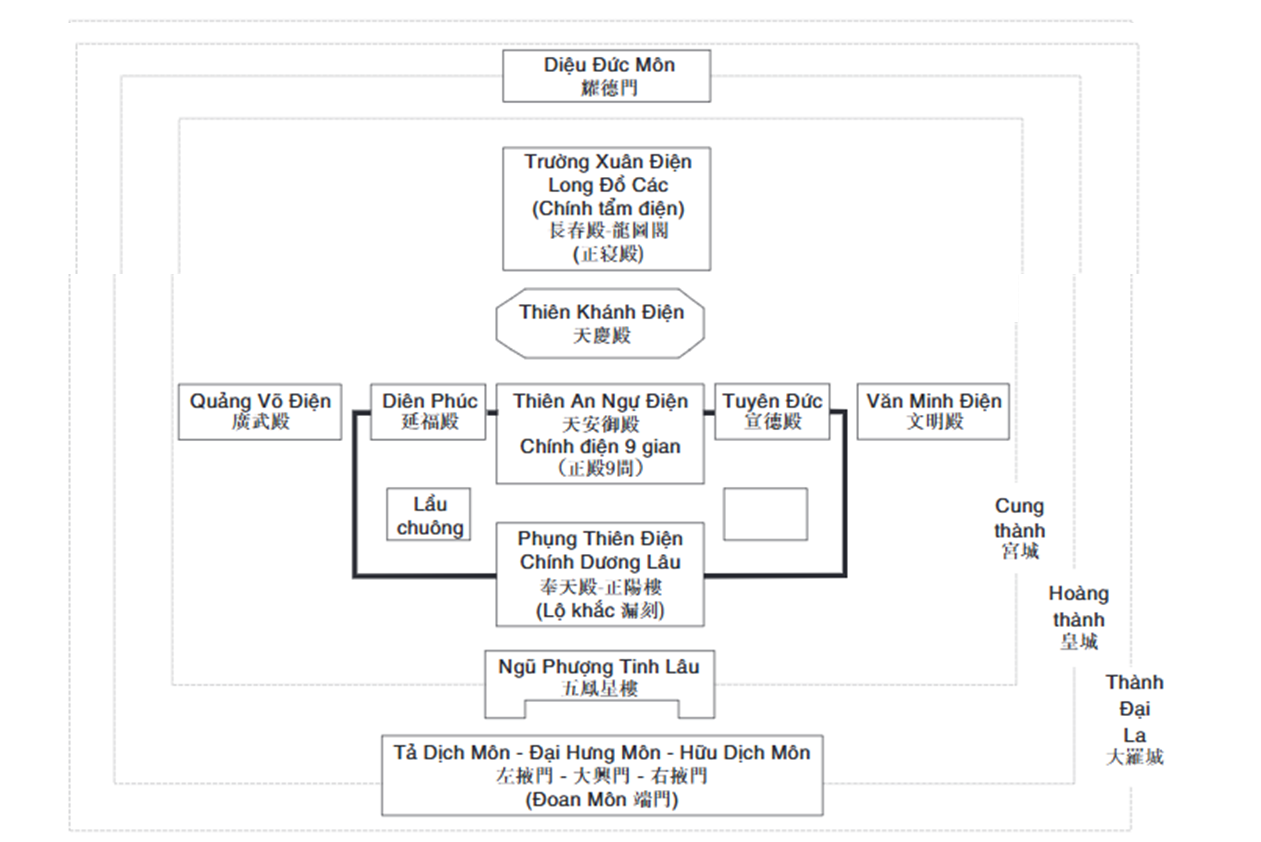
Outline of imperial palace during Lý dynasty in 1029.

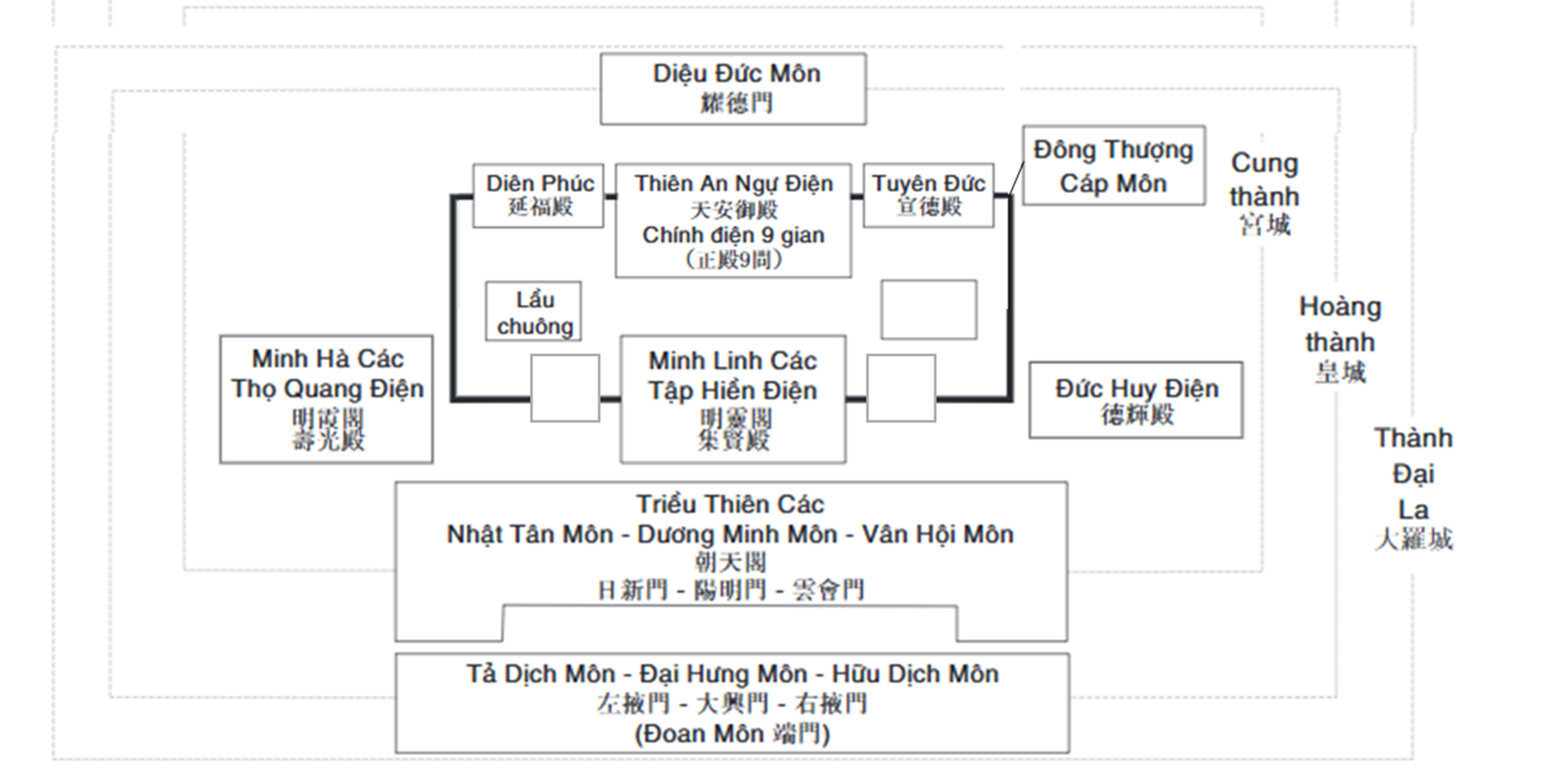
Outline of imperial palace during Trần dynasty.

When the large complex was first built, Thang Long Citadel was built according to a plan of three sectors arranged in rings, similar to the modern layout. The outermost sector is the primary defensive fortification of the citadel (called La thành or Kinh thành), the middle sector is the Imperial City (Vietnamese: Hoàng thành), between these two layers is a residential area, the innermost sector is the Forbidden City (or "Purple Forbidden City", from the Vietnamese Tử cấm thành; a term identical to the Forbidden City in Beijing). In 1029, Lý Thái Tông rebuilt the entire Forbidden City after it was destroyed by the Three Kings Rebellion. Later Lý rulers and rulers from dynasties would make additions and renovations to the complex.

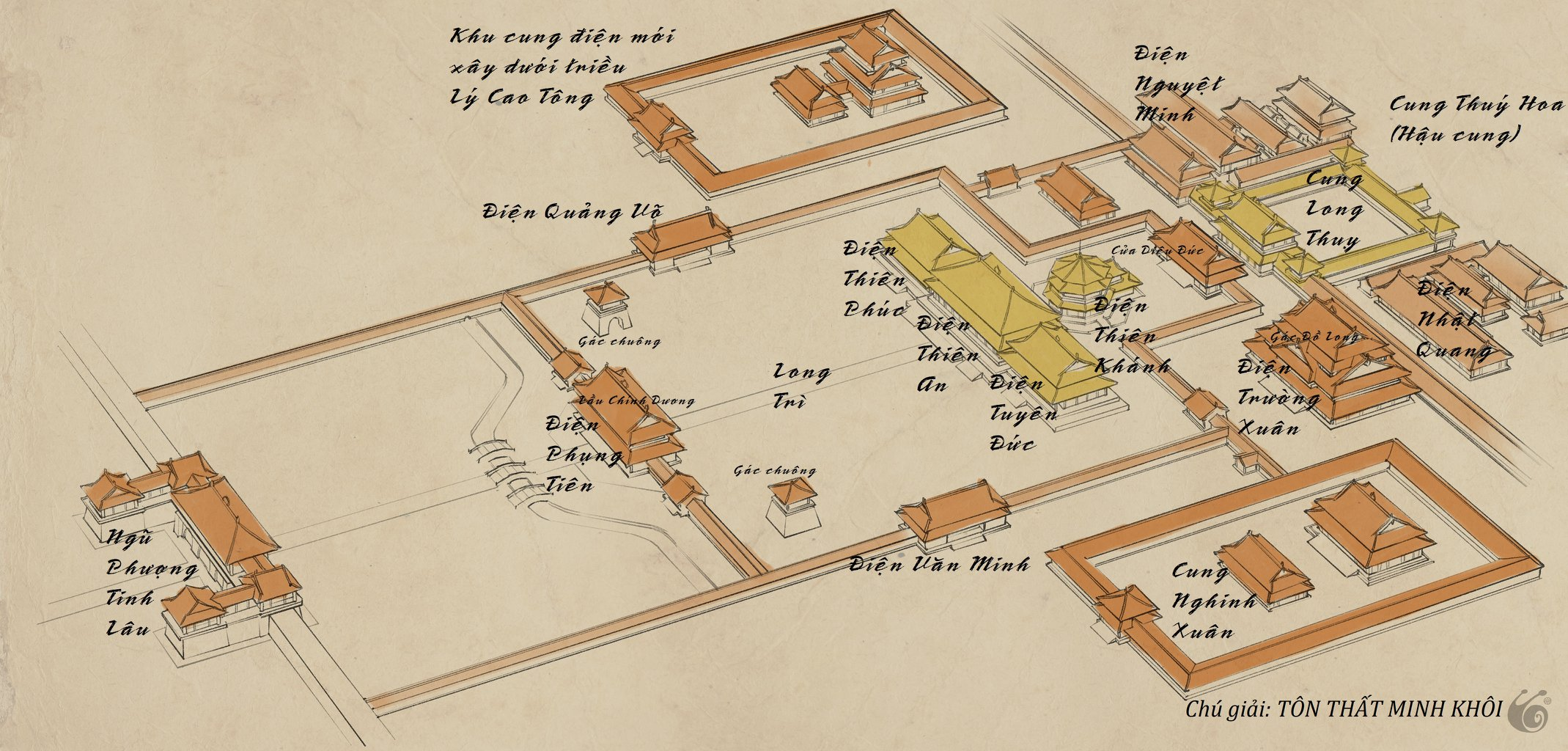
The illustration of the former palace during Lý dynasty in 1029.

The material remains of the original structure are limited to the foundations of the complex (mostly made from terracotta), an extensive drainage system, and various royal architectural decorations. The drainage and foundation systems are indicative of the site's large-scale urban design. Associated with the common view of the Lý dynasty as a Vietnamese "golden age" the archeological remains have deep significance to the national history of Vietnam.

=== Lê–Mạc period (15th–18th centuries) ===
Following a successful revolution against the Ming dynasty occupation, Lê Lợi took the reign name Lê Thái Tổ and established the Lê dynasty in 1428, with the capital still in Thăng Long under the new name of Đông Kinh. The rule of Đông Kinh under the Lê dynasty was very similar to the rule of Thăng Long under the Lý dynasty, with the change of name being largely symbolic. Lê Thái Tổ ordered repairs to the citadel after the damage caused left by the war with the Ming army.

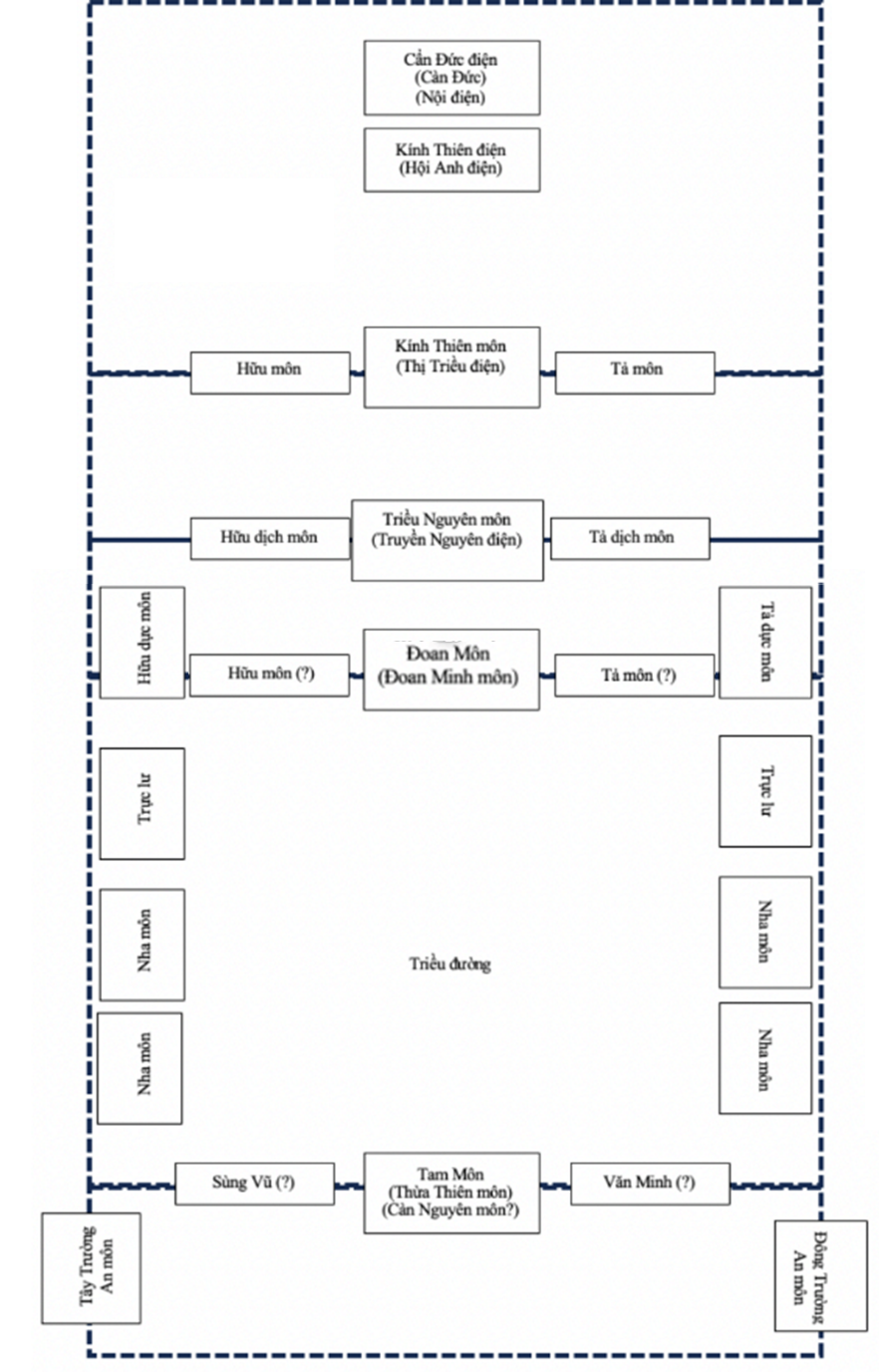
Map of imperial palace during Le dynasty in 1465

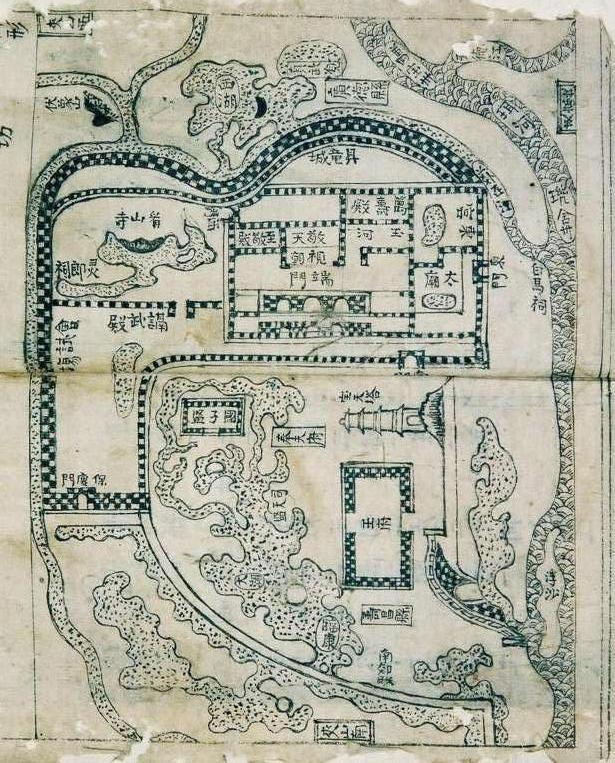
Outline of Lê dynasty imperial palace in 17th century.

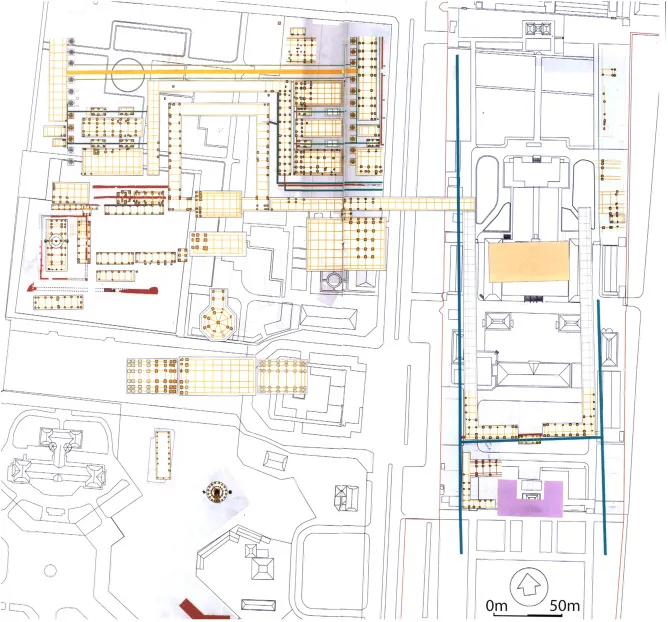
Outline of Lê dynasty imperial palace, Kính Thiên throne hall (orange ,left) was the most important building of the palace.

Rulers during the Mạc dynasty, controlled Đông Kinh from 1527 until 1592. In 1585 a period of construction began under Mạc Mậu Hợp. In 1592, the citadel was seized by armies from the Revival Lê dynasty and re-established as the dynasty's capital city, undergoing more repairs in 1599 and serving as a symbolic seat of power and administrative heartland for the Trịnh lords.

=== Nguyễn-French period (18th–20th centuries) ===
When the Nguyễn dynasty took control in 1802, after a period of war and Qing dynasty influence, the capital of Đại Việt was moved to Huế. A new Imperial Citadel, which followed the same three-sector plan as the Imperial Citadel at Thăng Long, was constructed there. Much of what was left of the Imperial Citadel of Thăng Long after the destructive war at the end of the 18th century was taken to serve the construction of the new citadel.

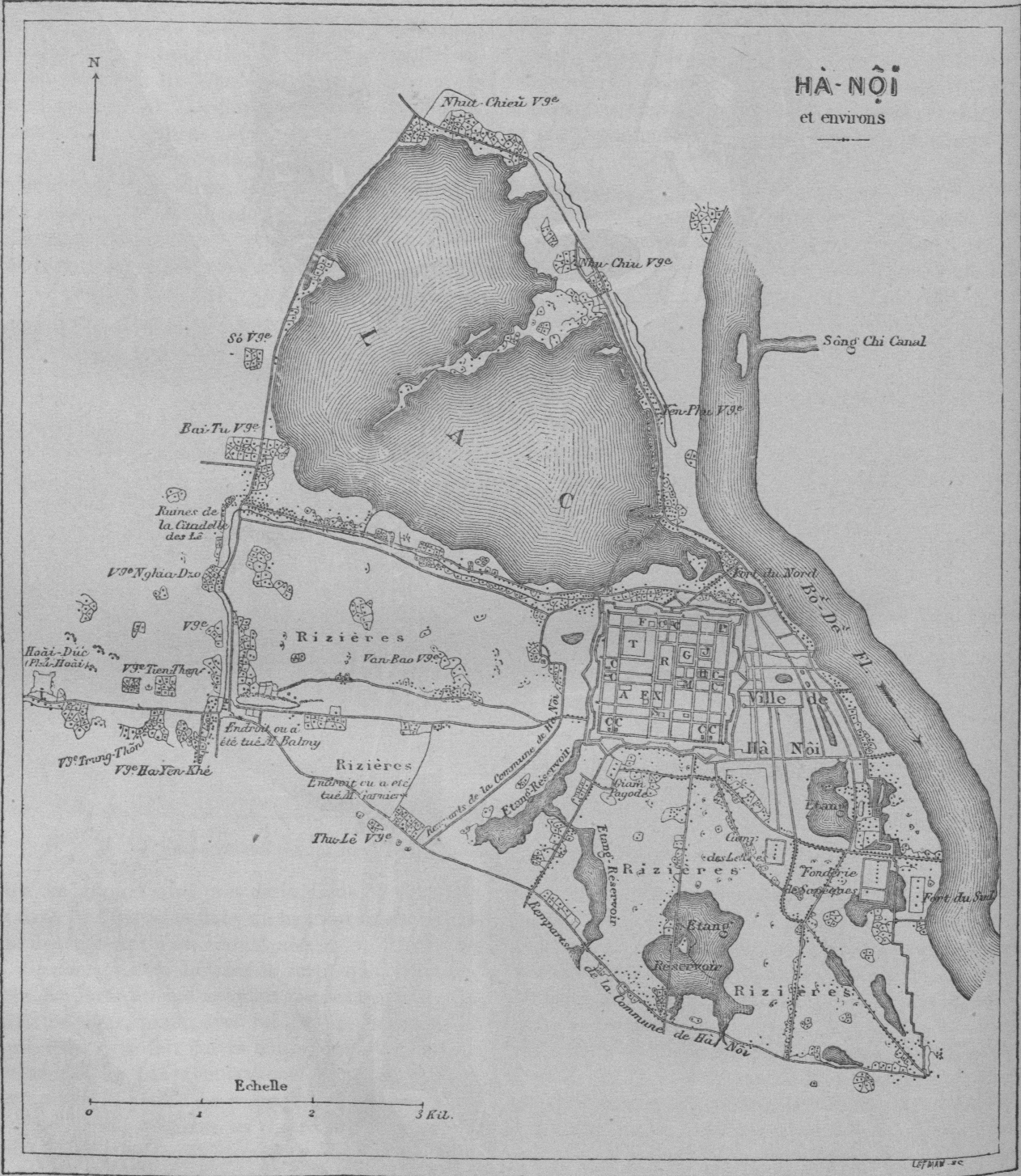
Map of Hanoi with the discernible quadrilateral outline of the Imperial City (1873)

In 1805, Gia Long enacted an extensive reconstruction of the old Imperial Citadel which truncated the complex and reconstructed the outer wall in the French the Vauban style. In 1831, during his administrative reform Minh Mang changed the name of Thăng Long to Hanoi province. This name existed until 1888 when the Nguyễn dynasty officially ceded Hanoi to the French, after which it would become the administrative capital of French Indochina Federation.

When it was controlled by the French as the capital of Indochina (1885–1954), the Citadel of Hanoi was largely demolished to make the land for offices and barracks. Except for the North Gate and the Flag Tower, what remains of Hanoi citadel to this day is only an archaeological site and restored. Systematic restoration and excavation began in the 21st century. In mid-1945 the Citadel was used by the Imperial Japanese Army to imprison over 4000 French colonial soldiers captured during the Japanese coup d'état in French Indochina in March 1945.

=== Democratic Republic-Socialist Republic period (20th century-present) ===
During period of the Democratic Republic of Vietnam, the Imperial Citadel was used as an administrative capital and headquarters for the North Vietnamese Ministry of Defense and Army. Several French structures were destroyed or re-appropriated, including what is now the Vietnam Military History Museum (formerly a French military headquarters). Between 1998 and 2000, minor renovations were made to the site so that it would be more accessible and safe for visitors. Major archeological discoveries were made as part of a construction project in 2002–2004. In 2004, the Ministry of Defense moved from the Central Sector of the site so that the relics could be more completely conserved by the Hanoi People's Committee Department of Culture and Information.

In 2009, the Citadel was inscribed as a Special Relic of National significance (Special National Site), making it the first site listed under that category. The Central Sector of the Imperial Citadel was listed in UNESCO's World Heritage Site on July 31, 2010, at its session in Brazil, as "The Central Sector of the Imperial Citadel of Thăng Long – Hanoi". The site has undergone several modifications as part of a larger ongoing plan for restoration.

== Relics ==
The Lý dynasty royal palaces and edifices were largely destroyed by the Nguyễn dynasty during reconstruction in the early 19th century. Many Nguyễn dynasty structures were later destroyed in the late 19th century during periods of French and Japanese control. The few remaining structures within the royal compound are the Main Gate (Đoan Môn), marking the southern entrance to the royal palace; the Hanoi Flag Tower (Cột cờ Hà Nội); the steps of Kinh Thiên Palace (Điện Kính Thiên); and the Rear Palace (Hậu Lâu).

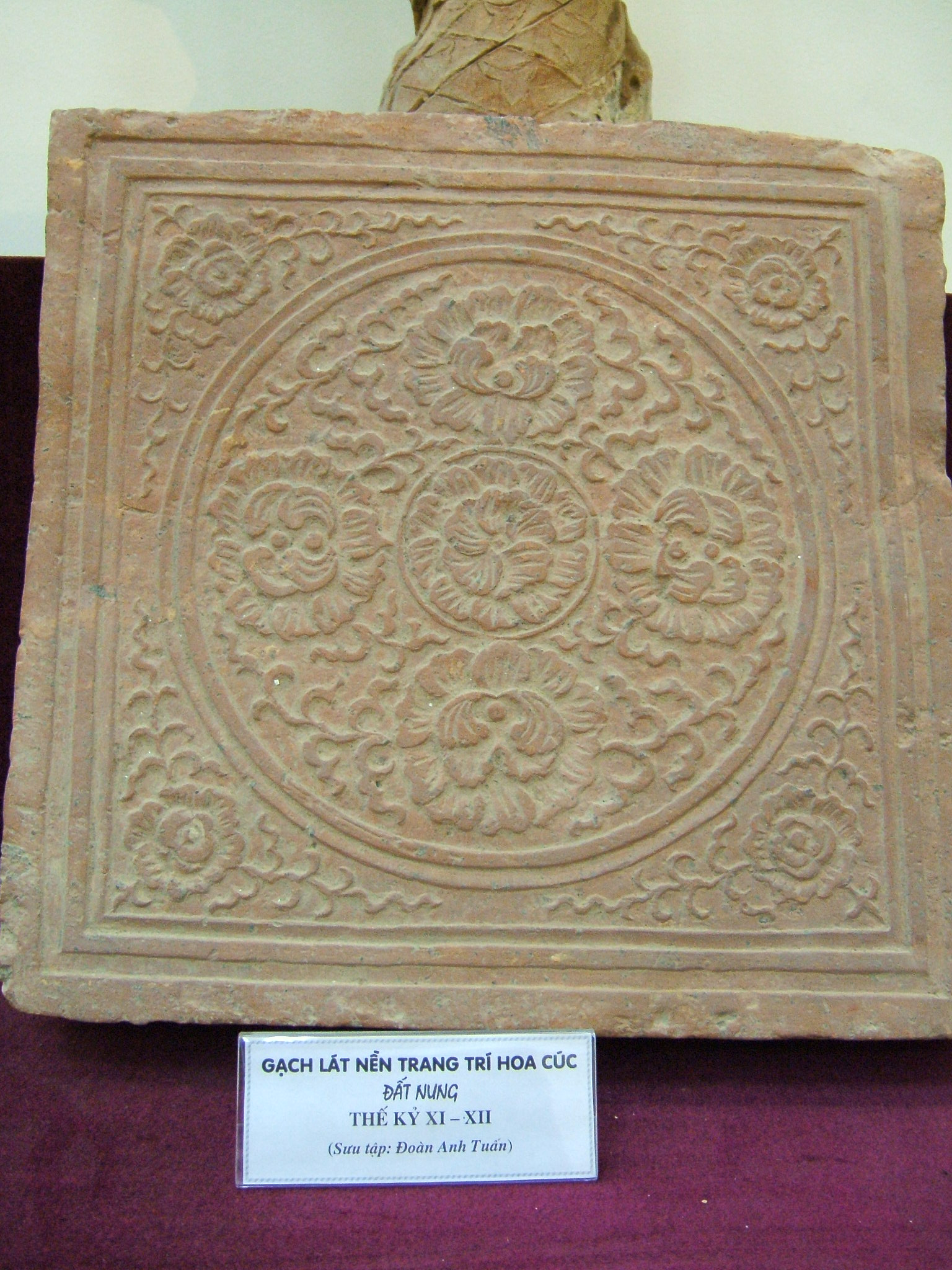
An 11th-12th century terracotta floor tile discovered at 18 Hoàng Diệu Street. decorated with chrysanthemums, indicative of royal embellishments.

Architectural and foundational remains of the Imperial City were discovered on the site of the former Ba Đình Hall at 18 Hoàng Diệu Street when the structure was torn down in 2008 to make way for a new parliament building. Various archaeological remains unearthed were brought to the National Museum to be exhibited. Thus far only a small fraction of Thăng Long has been excavated. Since the initial excavation, many restoration and heritage preservation projects have occurred at the site, including several National projects and a successful push for UNESCO recognition. The recognized world heritage site is about 18 hectares comprising two primary areas the Hanoi Ancient Citadel itself, where most of the standing Nguyễn dynasty remain, and the Archaeological Site 18 Hoàng Diệu Street directly to the East (including a buffer zone of 108 hectares for a protected area of about 126 hectares, out of a total of 140 hectares containing the entire Imperial Citadel). The Ancient Citadel is constructed on a slightly offset north–south axis and organized according to traditional geomantic principles (phong thuy; feng shui) which give the site a historic and spiritual significance.

=== Archaeological Site 18 Hoàng Diệu Street ===
This site consists of relics from the Đại La citadel under Gao Pian during the Tang dynasty, foundational and decorative remains from the Lý and Trần dynasties, remnants of Lê and Đông palaces, and structures indicating that the area was the center of the 19th century Hanoi citadel under the Nguyễn dynasty. The structural remains have recently led to new stylistic and structural insights about ancient Vietnamese architecture, which was one of the primary points of historical value for the site's nomination.

The current archeological results (cultural strata, artifacts) and geological survey results in the area are indicative of an ancient geomantic flow (in the north–south direction). Because natural ground has a poor load-bearing capacity, the architectural scale and complexity is considered a significant technical advancement of the Vietnamese in construction. Although it is not possible to confirm the size and function of all the works the foundations indicate, it is clear by the size of the area that these ruins show a rich architectural complex. Along with important discoveries of architectural vestiges, a large number of ceramics, which were used in daily life in the Royal Palace through many periods, were also found. These discoveries have aided in the study of Thang Long pottery over several phases of history.

Several exhibitions have displayed relics recovered from the Imperial Citadel since the excavations began. Since 2002, there have been several calls for an on-site museum to preserve archeological artefacts.

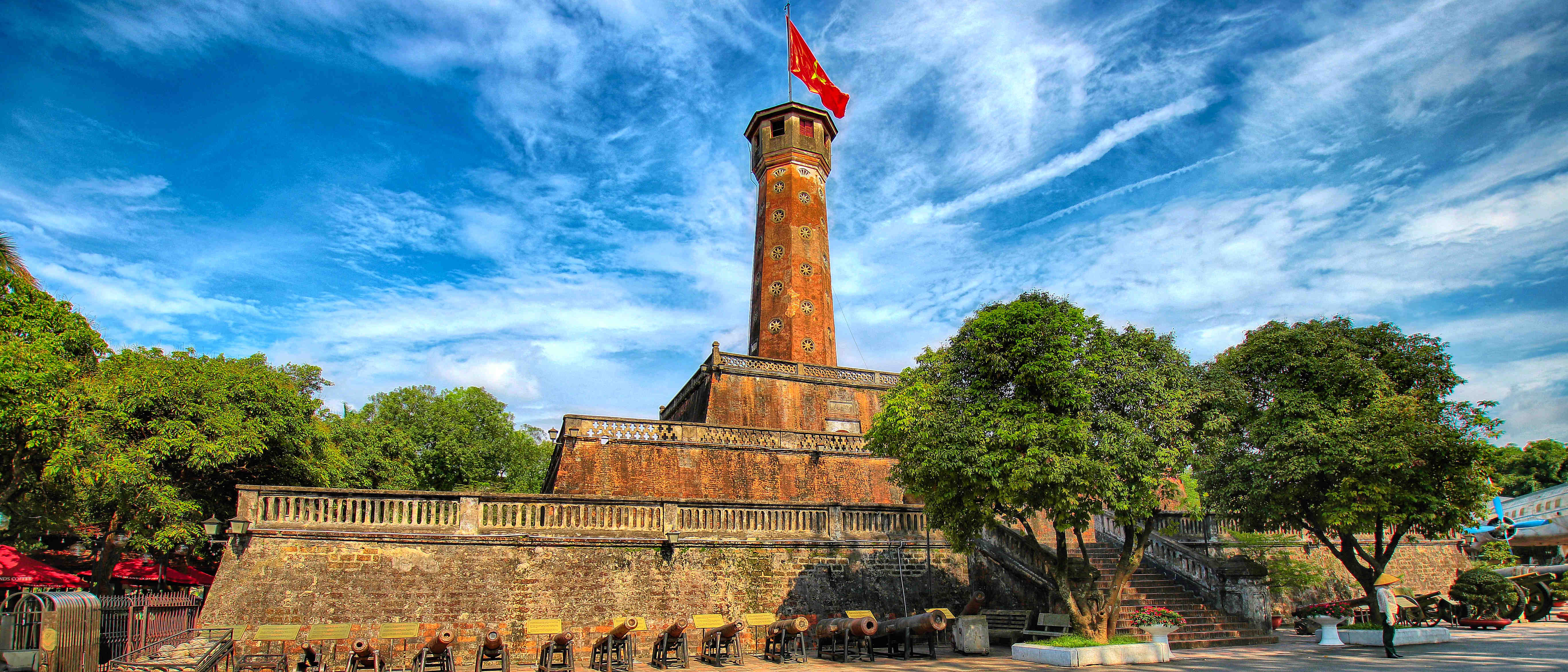
Hanoi Flag Tower

=== Hanoi Flag Tower ===
Among the structures related to the Imperial City is the Hanoi Flag Tower (Cột cờ Hà Nội). Rising to a height of 33.4 m (41 m with the flag, 60 m including the base), it is a culturally significant landmark and frequently used as a symbol of the city. Built in 1812 during the Nguyễn dynasty during the Vauban reconstruction of the citadel, the tower, unlike many other structures in Hanoi, was spared during the French colonial rule as it was used as a military post (and as such is included as part of the Vietnam Military History Museum). It stands on the foundation of the outer gate of the Forbidden City during the Lê dynasty.

=== Main Gate (Đoan Môn, 端門) ===
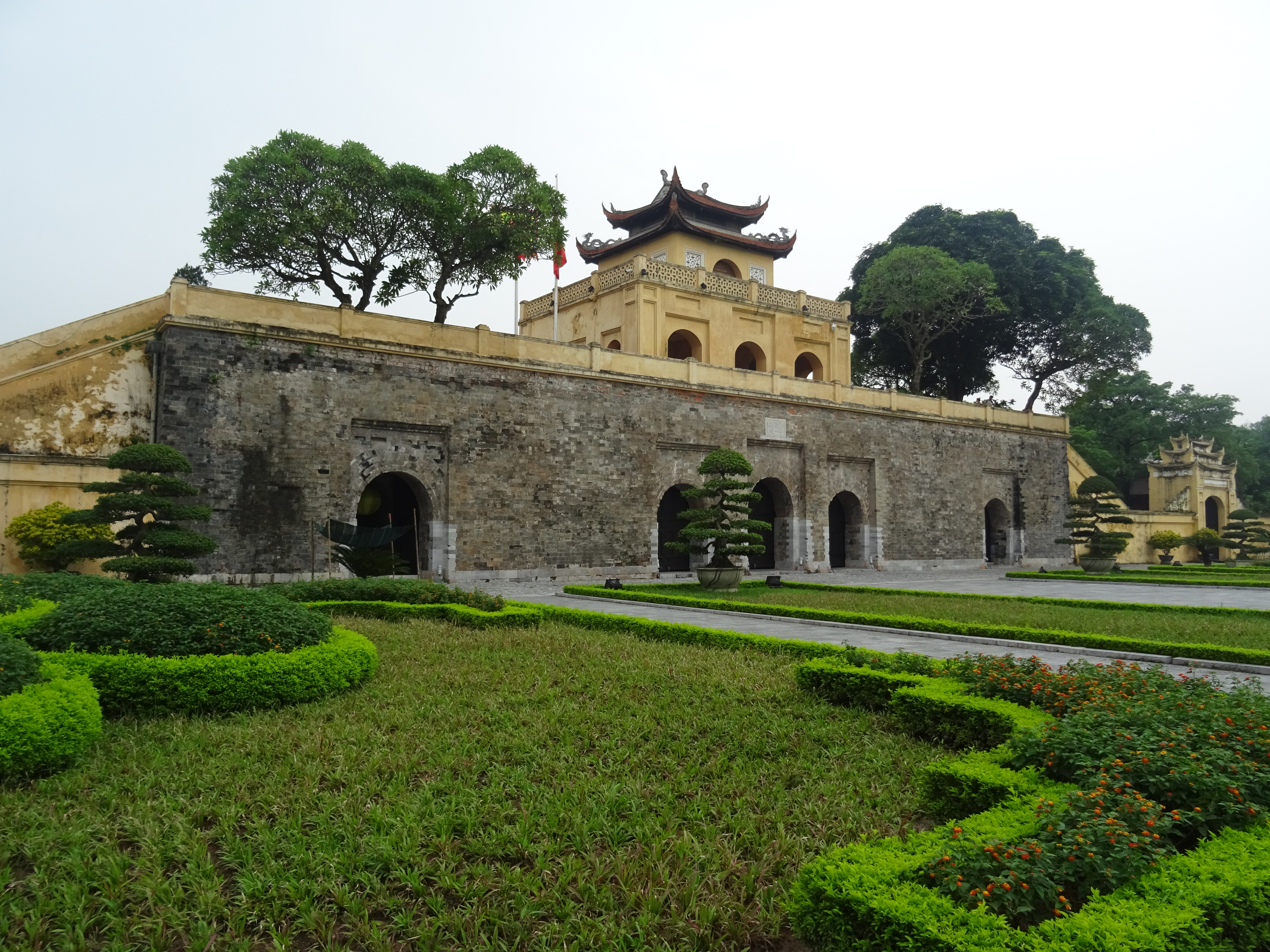
Đoan Môn gate (2018)

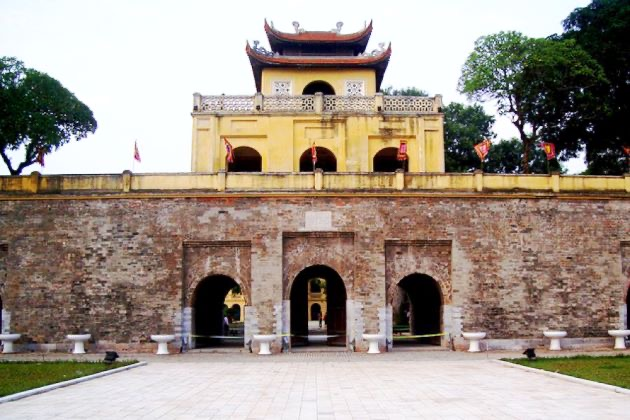
Đoan Môn (street view of south façade, 2021)

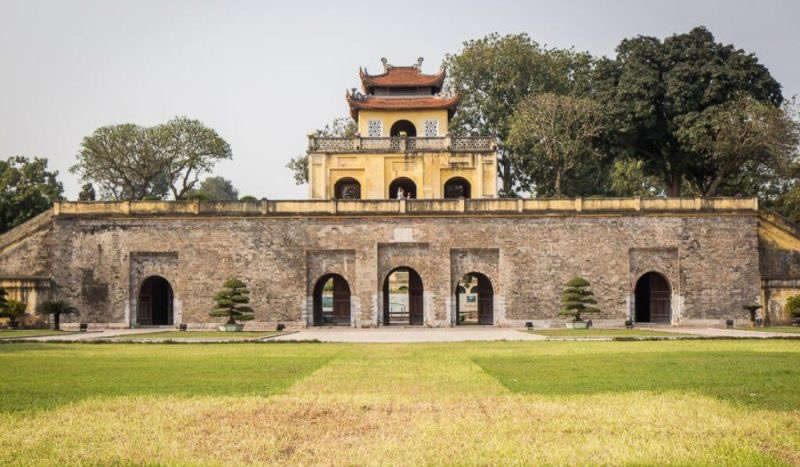
Đoan Môn (full view of south façade, 2021)

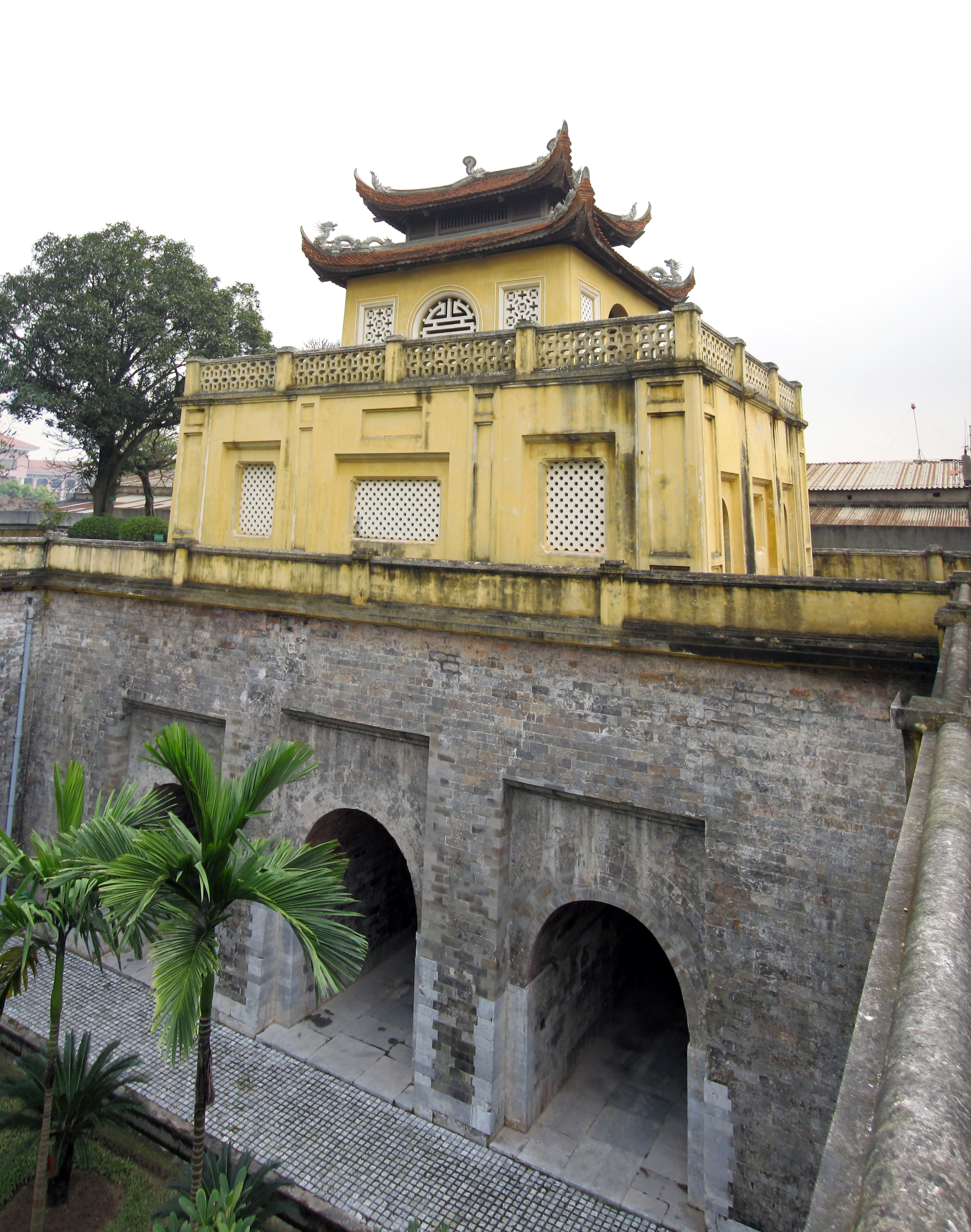
Đoan Môn (closer view of the Nguyen dynasty pavilion from the north, 2008)

Đoan Môn is the archway leading to Kinh Thiên throne hall and the primary (southernmost) entrance to the Forbidden City. Đoan Môn consists of five gates built of stone. A similar gate was constructed during the Lý dynasty, but the standing structure is dated to the Lê dynasty, with additions and reconstructions made during the Nguyễn dynasty renovations. The gate and the courtyard behind it have served important ceremonial roles as a location for rituals, festivals, and other events. The five gates served as entrances for different classes in periods where the Imperial Citadel housed the royal family: the centermost gate was reserved for the emperor, and the two nearer gates were used by members of the royal family or high-ranking officials.

The second-floor terrace over the entrance has a palatial-style pavilion added during the Nguyễn dynasty. The masonry and ornamentation employed are indicative of the period's construction techniques.

In 2002, Vietnamese archaeologists, who were allowed to dig in the area, found the "ancient carriageway" of the Trần dynasty, using many Lý bricks, the study of which is still ongoing.

=== Kinh Thiên throne hall ===
Kinh Thiên Palace is the primary relic of Hanoi's Ancient Citadel, located in the center of the Forbidden City thus bearing the most geomantically important location therein. The vestiges of Kinh Thiên Palace are only the old foundations and the steps up onto them, since the palace was demolished by the French to construct and artillery headquarters (a neoclassical building called the "Dragon House").

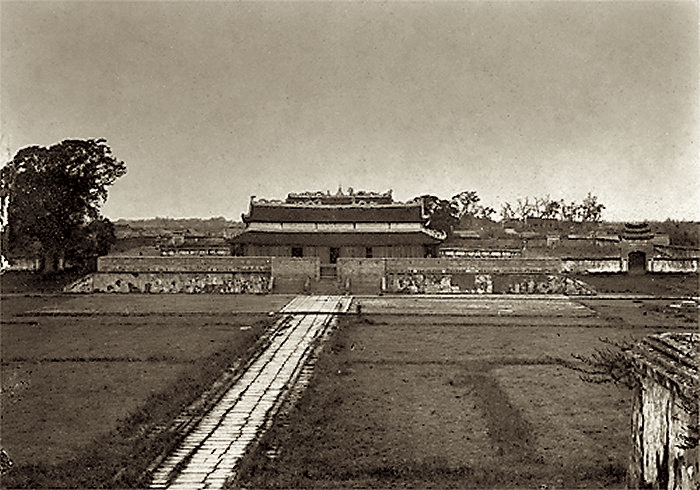
Kính Thiên Palace, rebuilt by emperor Gia Long as private residence when travelling to North Vietnam which was later destroyed by the colonial French (photo taken during the French invasion of Tonkin in 1883)

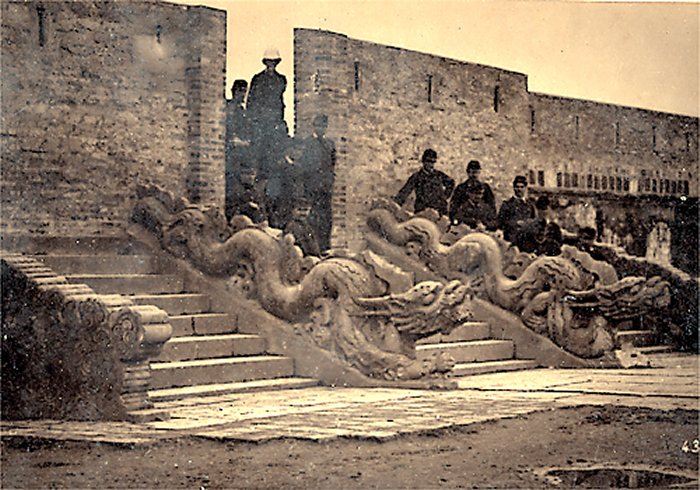
A photo of Kinh Thiên Palace showing the front-entrance Dragon Steps (1886)

The front, south entrance of Kinh Thiên Palace platform features a large staircase consisting of 10 steps divided into three equal parts (used similarly to the gates of the Đoan Môn, with the central staircase reserved for the emperor and the others reserved for the royal family and officials) by two large dragon statues, constituting what are called the "Dragon Steps". These two stone dragons were carved in 1467 century during the Lê dynasty. Kinh Thiên Palace's stone dragon sculptures are considered a masterpiece of Vietnamese architectural and artistic heritage, representing the sculpture art of the early Lê dynasty. Another set of similar dragon statues—smaller, but similarly detailed and symbolic—were added to the rear of the palace at the turn of the 17th century.

=== Rear Palace (Hậu Lâu) ===
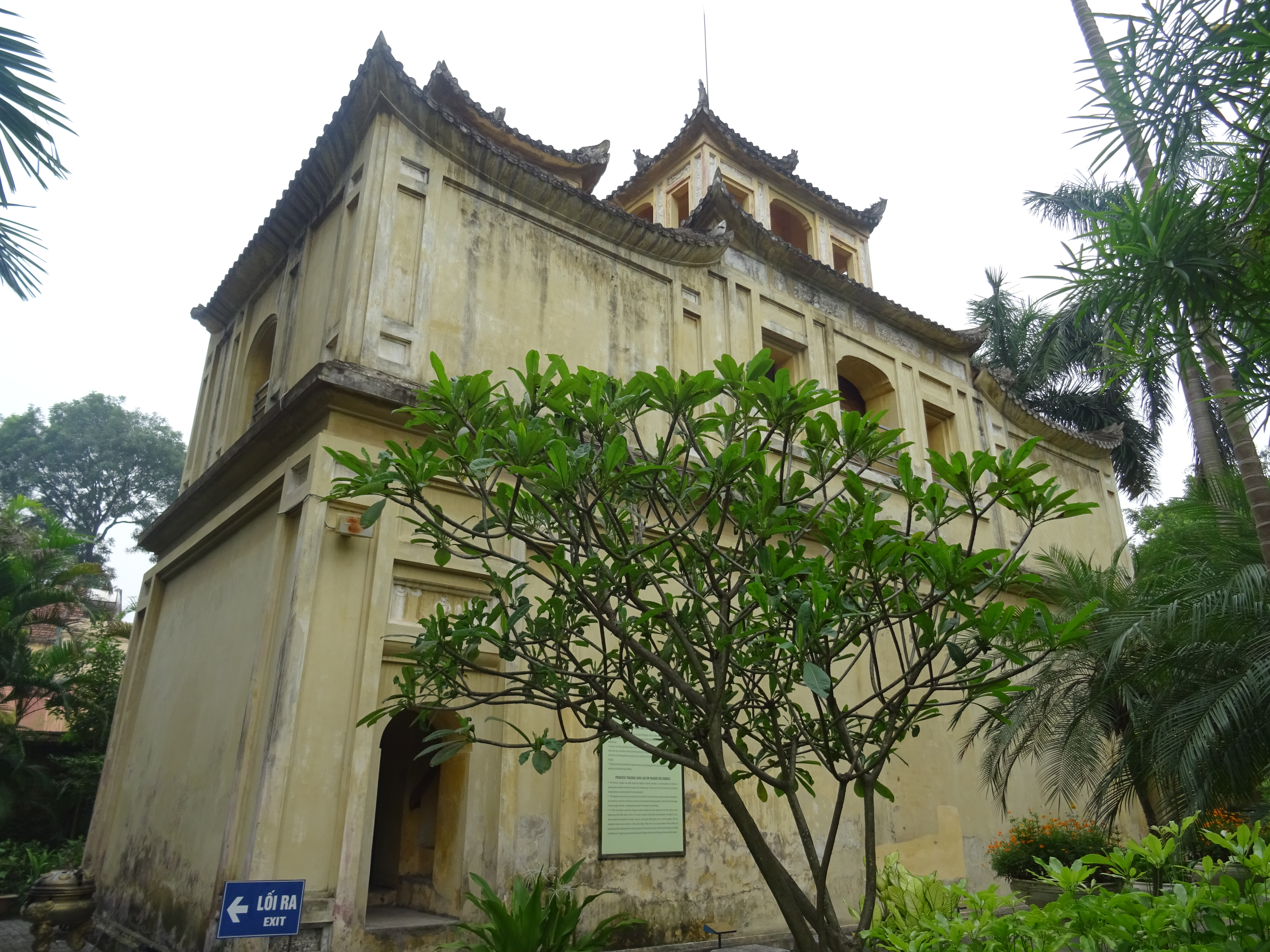
Hậu Lâu (2018)

Also known as the Northern Palace (Vietnamese: Tĩnh Bắc lâu) or the Princess' Palace, the standing structure was built during the Nguyễn dynasty to house concubines when the emperor was in Hanoi and significantly reconstructed after severe damage at the end of the 19th century. Excavations beginning in 1998 revealed Lý, Trần, and Lê dynasty foundations as well as remains of fine pottery.

=== North Gate (Cửa Bắc, or Bắc Môn) ===
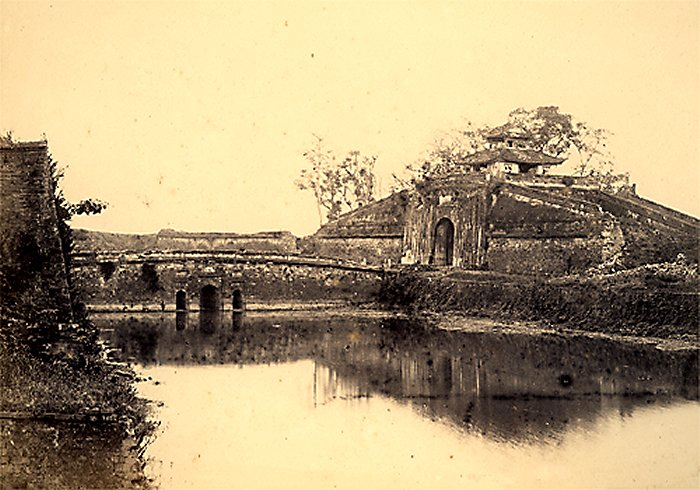
Front view of the North Gate with moat (1885)

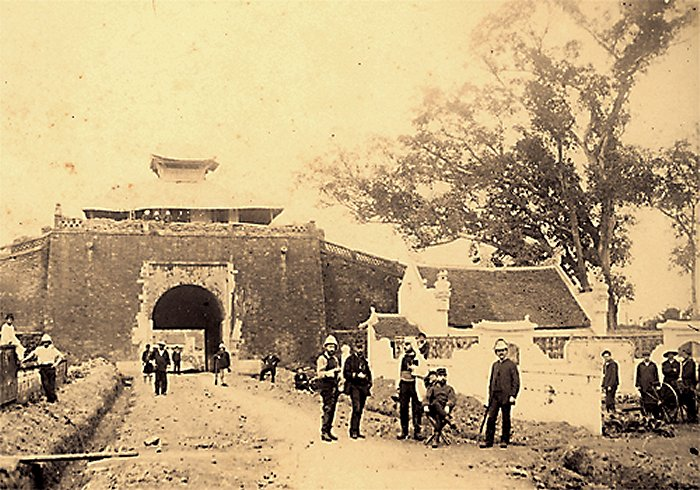
Back façade from inside the citadel (1884–1885)

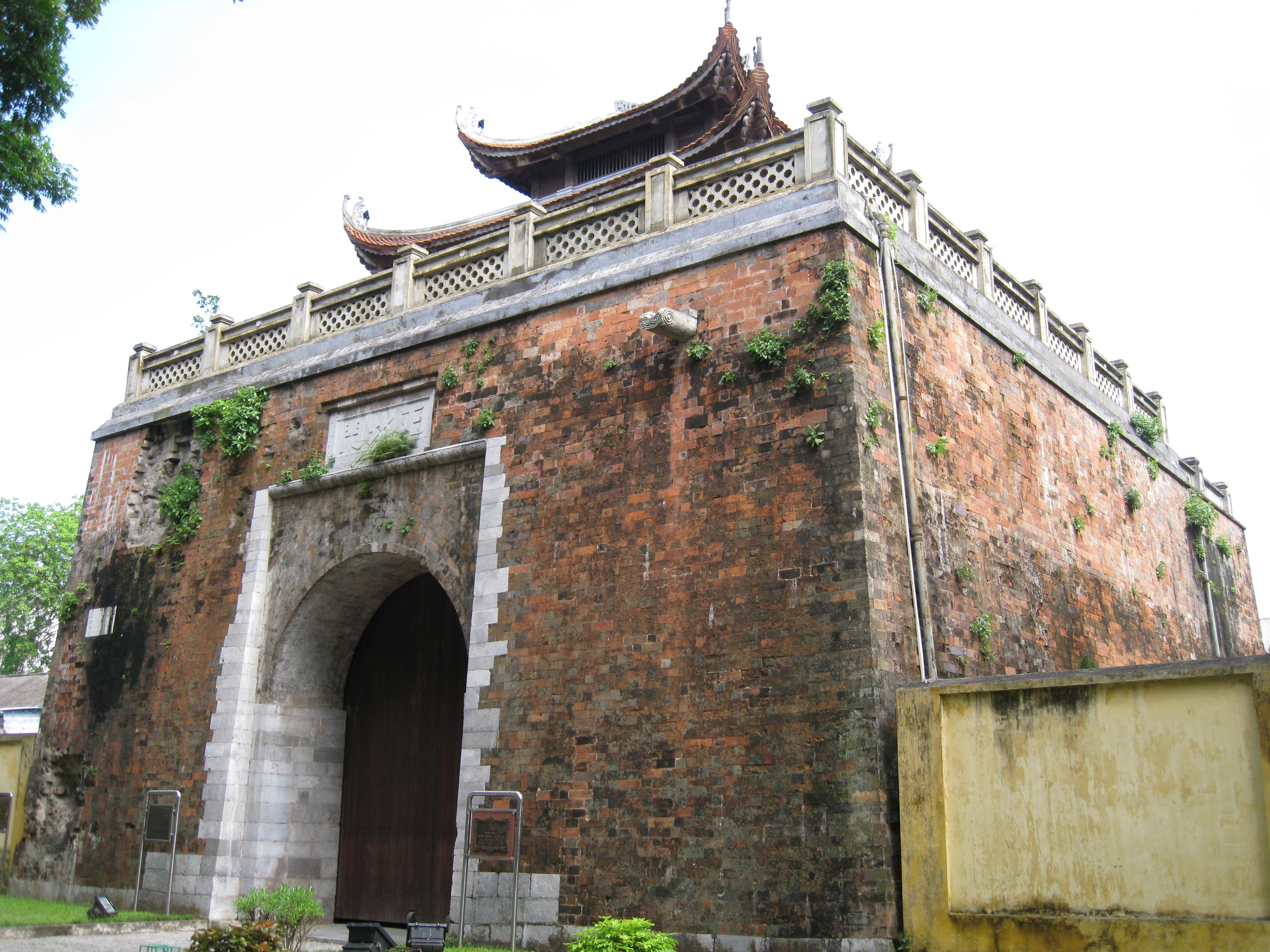
The North Gate (2009)

The North Gate is the last standing gate of five built for the Nguyễn dynasty reconstruction of the citadel. The structure is mainly built of embellished brick and stone, and Lê dynasty foundations were found near the structure in 1998. The north face of the structure has cannon marks from the 1882 Battle for the Hanoi Citadel.

=== Building D67 and bunker ===
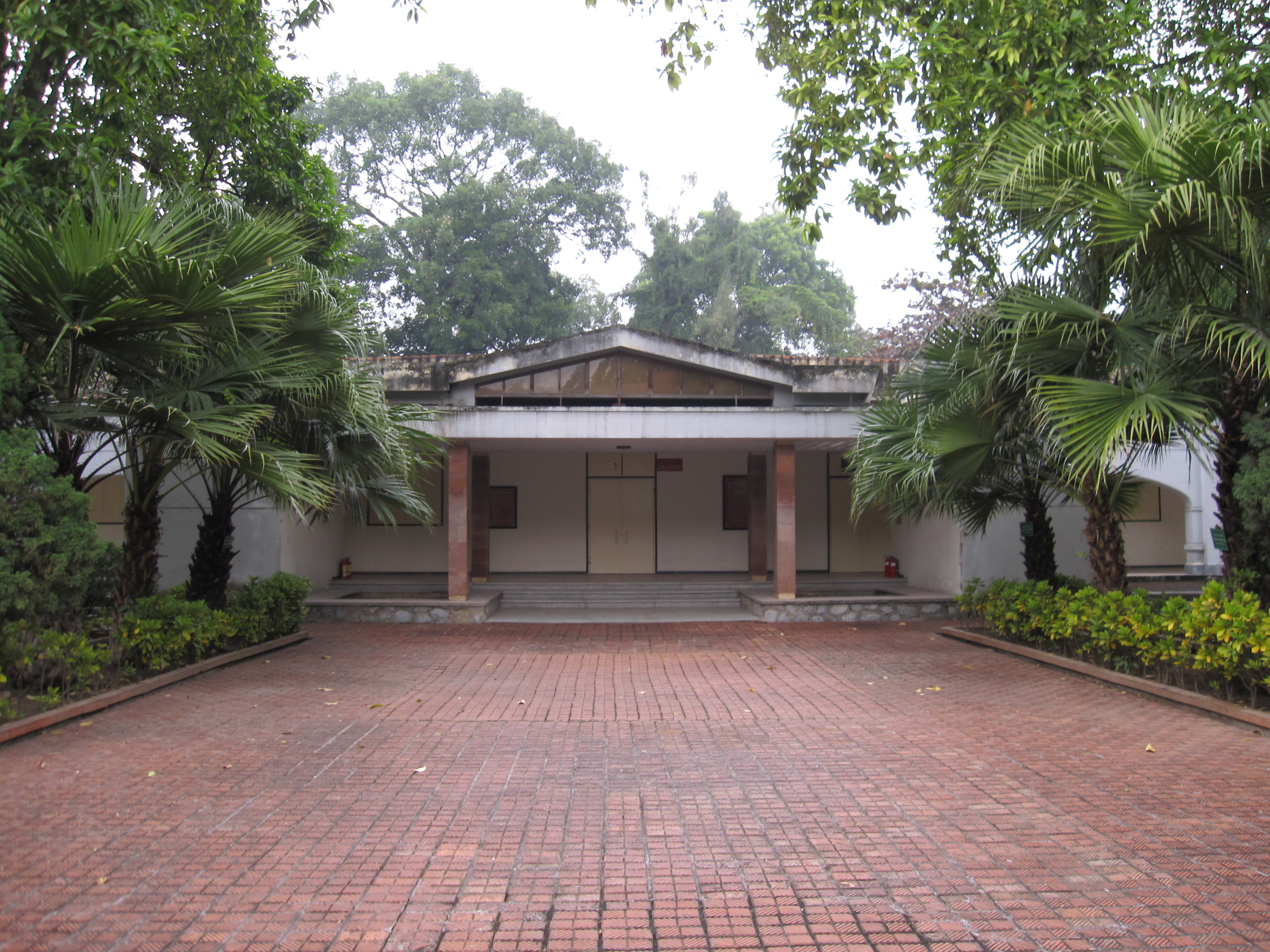
Façade of Building D67 (2008)

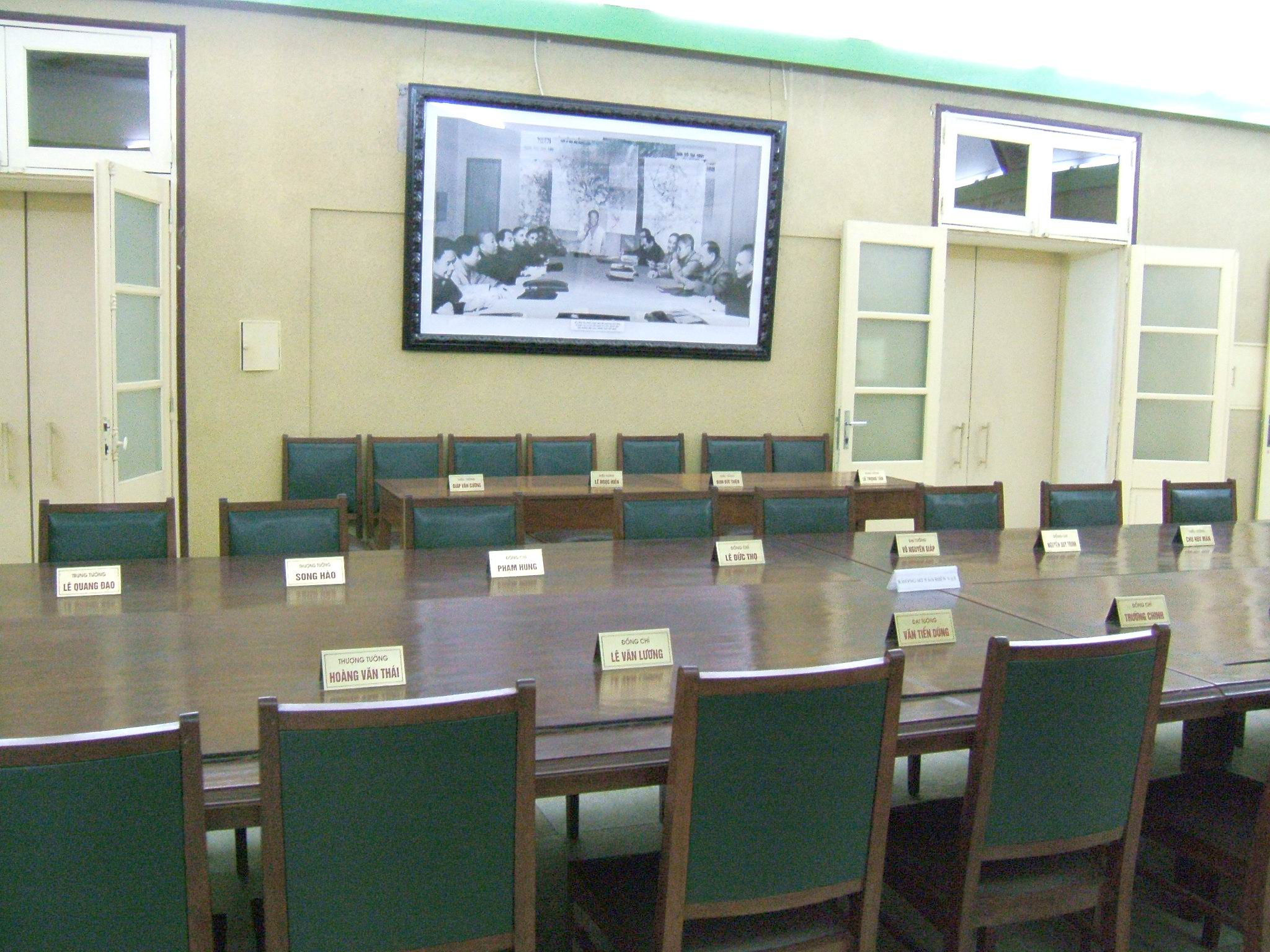
Meeting room of the Politburo and the Central Military Commission in the underground tunnel D67 (2008)

From 1954 to 1975, the People's Army of Vietnam, had its headquarters within the Citadel. Building D67 was constructed (as the name suggests) in 1967. It was built the contemporary architectural style (to look like a house and hide its military significance) with many defensive features, including a 60-centimeter thick soundproofing wall, reinforced entrances, and a connecting tunnel that allowed for emergency evacuation in case of an attack. The building currently serves as a museum which exhibits tools that comrades in the Politburo and the Central Military Commission, the Ministry of Defense and the General Staff used in the Vietnam War. The building and tunnel are situated on the northern part of the Kinh Thiên Palace foundations.

== See also ==
- Hoa Lư Ancient Capital
- Hùng Temple
- Imperial City of Huế
