= Vietnam Military History Museum =

National museum in Hanoi, Vietnam

- Bảo tàng Lịch sử Quân sự Việt Nam
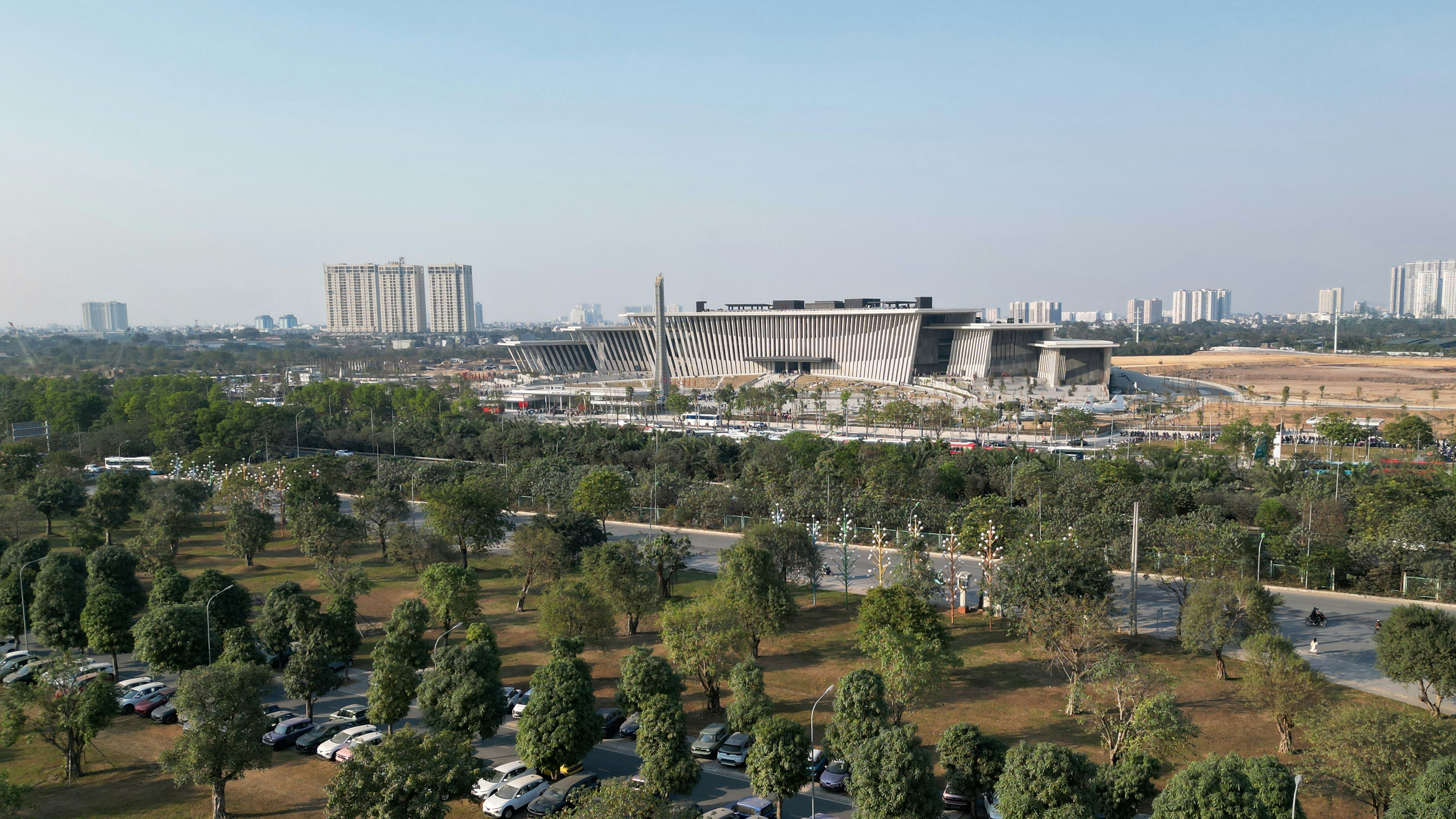
- Established: July 17, 1956
- Location: Km 6+500 Thang Long Boulevard, Tay Mo and Dai Mo Wards, Nam Tu Liem District, Hanoi, Vietnam
- Coordinates: 21.010416398067402°N 105.7541142253774°E
- Collection size: more than 15,000
- Website: btlsqsvn.org.vn

The Vietnam Military History Museum, set up on 17 July 1956, is one of seven national museums in Vietnam.

The new museum was opened in November 2024, located at Km 6+500 of Thăng Long Boulevard, Tây Mỗ Ward and Đại Mỗ Ward, Nam Từ Liêm District, Hanoi. Previously, the old museum was situated at 28A Điện Biên Phủ Street, Điện Biên Ward, Ba Đình District, opposite Lenin Park, within the premises of the Imperial Citadel of Thang Long.

== History ==
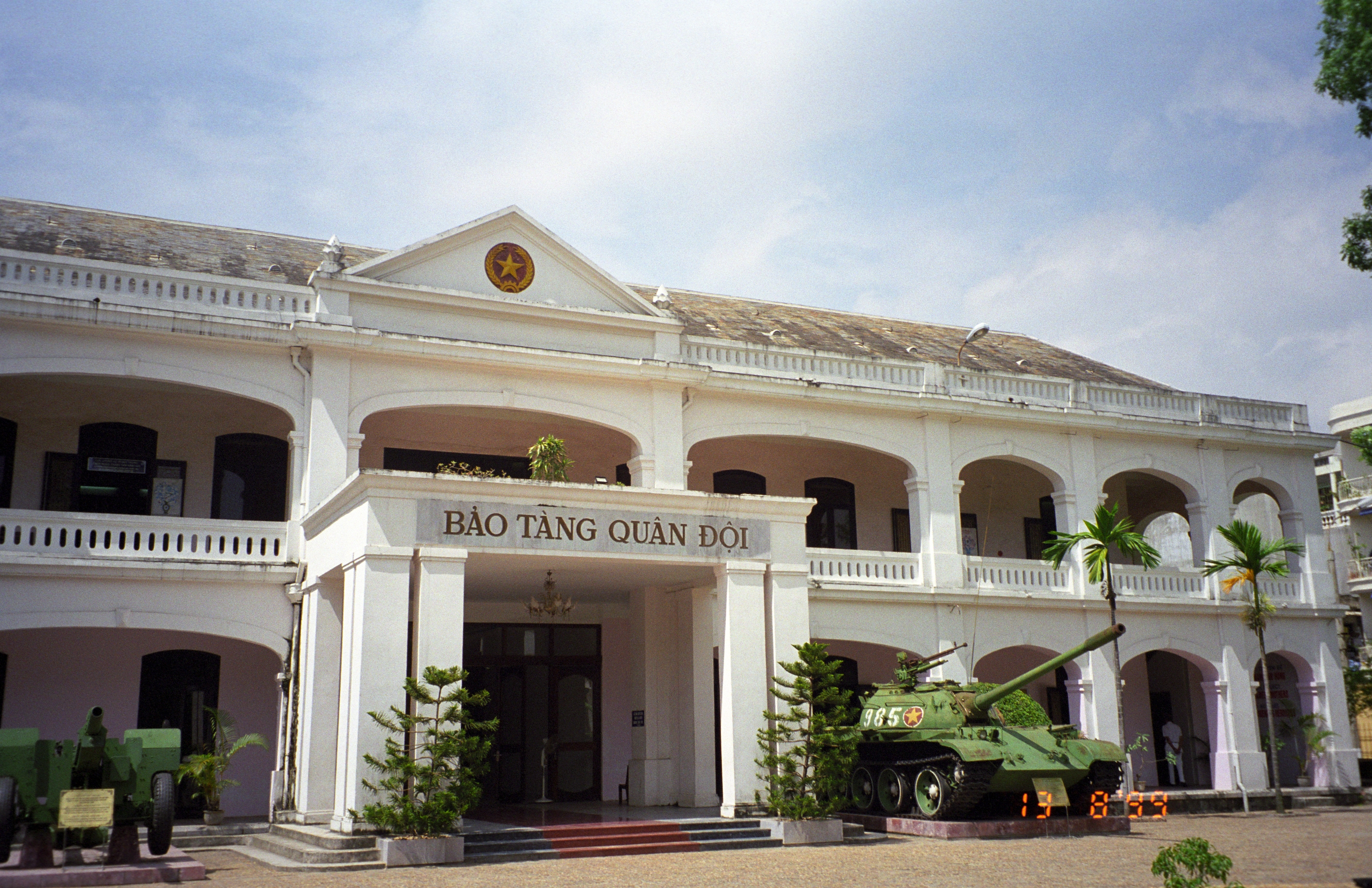
Former Vietnam Military History Museum, photo taken on August 13, 1999.

According to Decree No. 65/SL-TN, dated November 23, 1945, issued by President Hồ Chí Minh on "Preserving cultural heritage," between 1945 and 1954, the Ministry of Defense directed agencies and units to focus on collecting and preserving documents, images, and artifacts. On that basis, at the end of 1954, the General Military Commission (now the Central Military Commission of the Communist Party of Vietnam) initiated the project to establish the Military Museum.

The Military Museum Construction Committee, consisting of 13 members, was tasked with "Researching and collecting documents, artifacts, and historical relics related to the military; systematically organizing collected materials; preserving historical military artifacts; cooperating with localities to guide the preservation of local military historical relics; and developing plans to build and organize the Military Museum."

Immediately after its formation, the Committee began drafting regulations and documents related to conservation and museology to assist the General Political Department in directing the entire army to collect materials and artifacts — both for building unit tradition rooms and contributing to the future museum. With a sense of urgency and close supervision from the General Political Department leadership, after more than three years of preparation and exhibition setup, on December 21, 1959 — marking the 15th anniversary of the Vietnam People's Army (December 22, 1944 – December 22, 1959) — the Military Museum officially opened to the public.

After completing the construction and inauguration tasks, the Military Museum Construction Committee was reorganized into the Military Museum Department under the Department of Propaganda and Training of the General Political Department, responsible for "Welcoming and guiding visitors, protecting and preserving artifacts and storage facilities, and performing minor maintenance on exhibition systems."

In 2020, the investment project for the new Vietnam Military History Museum was initiated, located in Nam Từ Liêm District (Hanoi), adjacent to the Thăng Long Boulevard and opposite the Vinhomes Smart City urban area. This is a special-grade project, managed by the General Political Department of the Vietnam People's Army, built on a site of over 74 hectares with a total investment of 2,500 billion VND.The museum covers a total area of 38.66 hectares, designed with four above-ground floors and one semi-basement. It features a modern and intuitive design that creates a historical flow, harmonizing architectural lighting with natural light, and integrates multimedia systems and directional audio systems for interactive visitor experiences.

On August 31, 2023, Colonel General Trịnh Văn Quyết, Deputy Director of the General Political Department, emphasized the need for agencies to enhance responsibility, strengthen cooperation, and implement effective measures to overcome obstacles, mobilize all resources, and accelerate construction progress to meet the planned schedule. This project is considered meaningful for both the past and future, serving as an architectural landmark not only for the Army but also for Hanoi and the entire country. It will contribute to promoting the history, culture, tourism, and socio-economic development of Hanoi, while preserving the region's architecture and landscape. According to reports from contractors, by July 30, 2024, the outdoor construction packages are expected to be completed to allow system integration trials; by August 30, 2024, the main building's work and outdoor and indoor exhibitions will be substantially completed; from September 1, 2024, full system integration will be carried out, with the museum officially handed over and operational by October 2024.

On November 1, 2024, the new Vietnam Military History Museum will officially open and offer free admission until December.

On December 26, 2024, the Ministry of National Defense decided to merge the entire premises of the old Vietnam Military History Museum at 28A Điện Biên Phủ, Ba Đình District, into the Imperial Citadel of Thăng Long.

== Layout ==
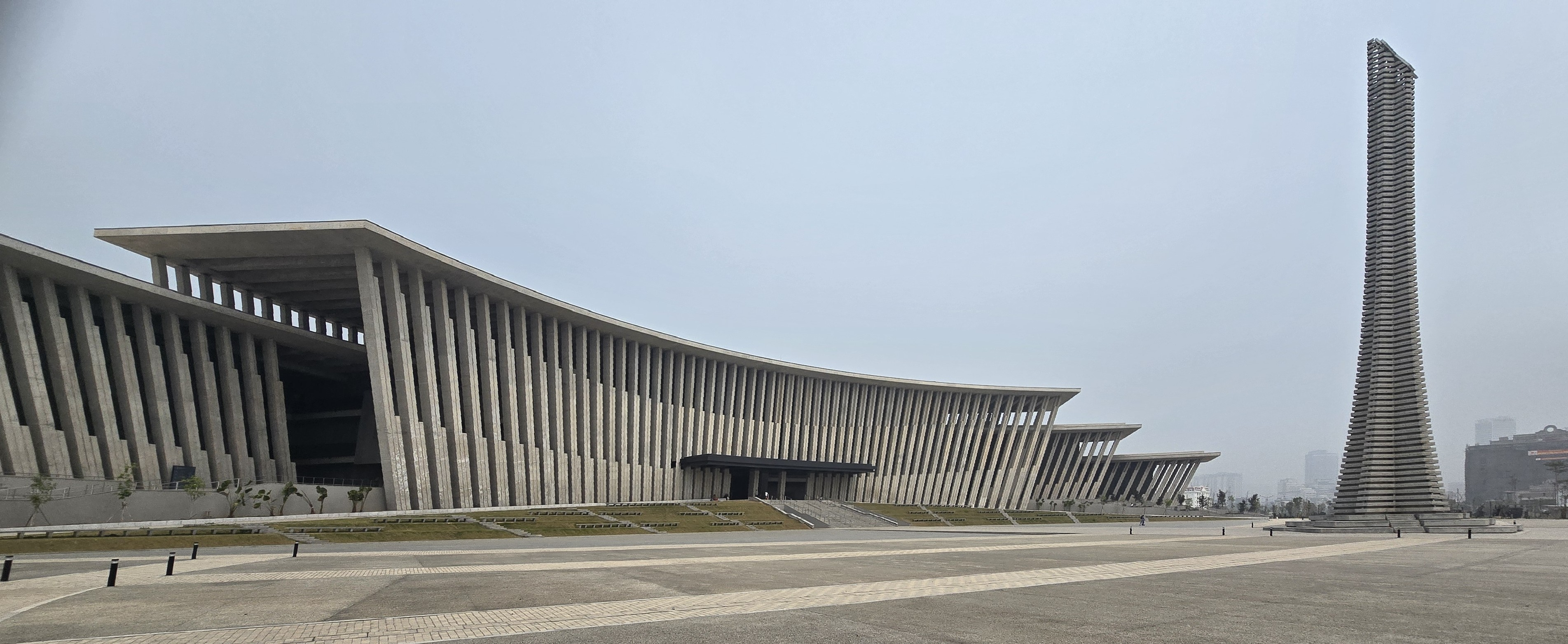
The outside of the new museum.

The layout of the Vietnam Military History Museum is thoughtfully organized to present a coherent and immersive journey through the nation's military history. The museum complex is divided into several main zones:

- Indoor Exhibition Area:Featuring four above-ground floors and one semi-basement, the main building showcases artifacts, documents, and multimedia presentations. The exhibits are arranged chronologically and thematically, guiding visitors through major historical periods, from early struggles for independence to modern military development.
- Outdoor Display Area: This open-air space exhibits large military equipment, including tanks, aircraft, artillery, and missile systems, allowing visitors to observe artifacts up close.
- Reception and Education Area: Includes information desks, orientation halls and multimedia interactive zones, designed to enhance visitors' learning experiences and engagement.
- Public Amenities: Facilities such as cafés, souvenir shops, resting areas, and landscaped gardens provide comfort and convenience for visitors throughout their visit.

The architectural design emphasizes a modern and intuitive flow, harmoniously combining historical narratives with natural light, advanced lighting techniques, and directional sound systems. The museum integrates traditional exhibitions with modern interactive technologies, offering a dynamic and accessible experience for audiences of all ages.

== Exhibits ==
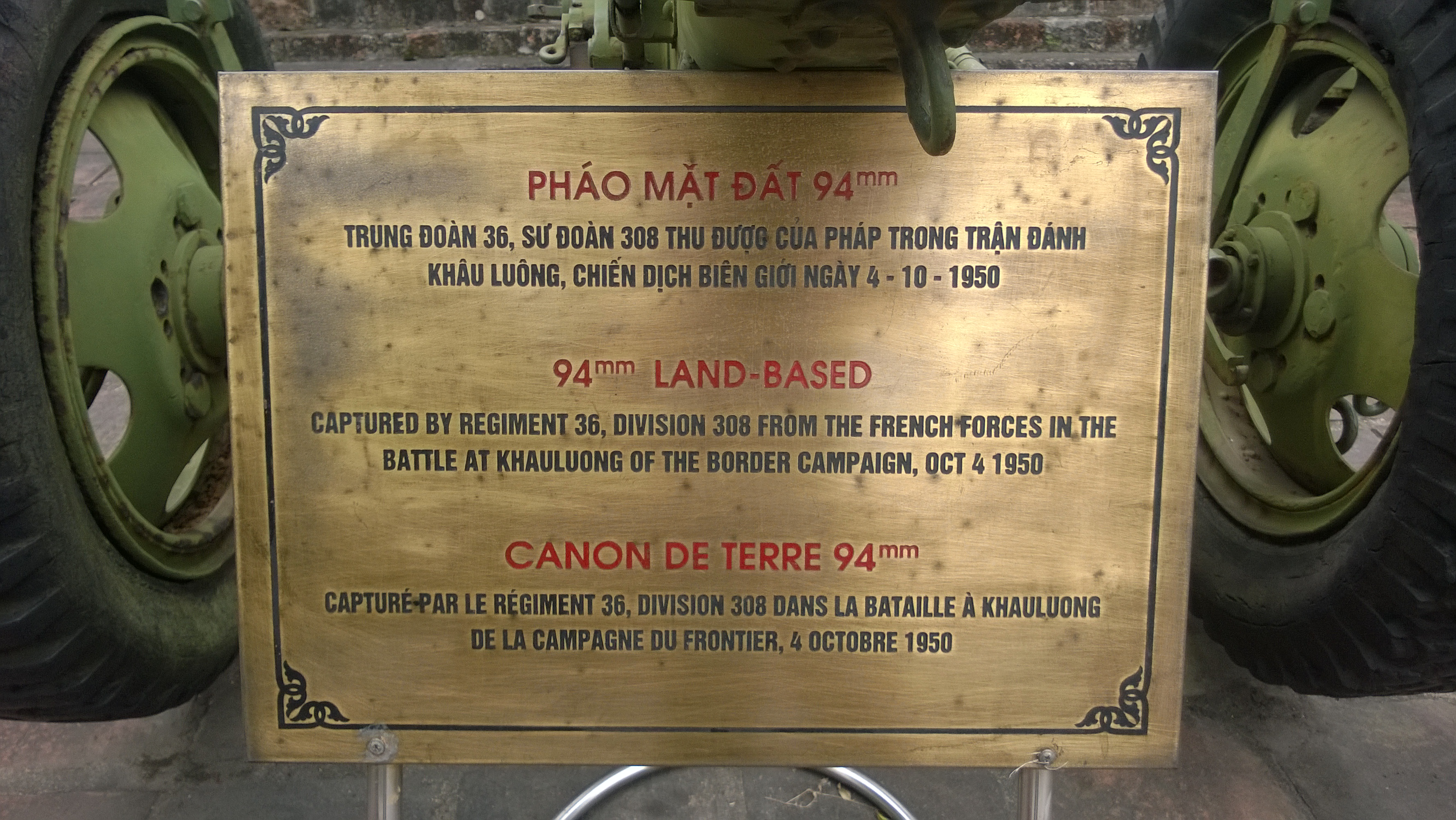
Placards in the museum are written in English, French, and Vietnamese

The museum does not always give context or explanation surrounding the exhibits. The exhibits mostly consist of artifacts. It is best to inform oneself about the First and Second Indochina wars if one wants to understand the artifacts and the references within the notecards.

There are some English and French placards containing information on the war eras. Audiovisual elements are often only available in Vietnamese. Note cards explaining each artifact are in both Vietnamese, French and English.

=== A History of Vietnam's military conflicts ===
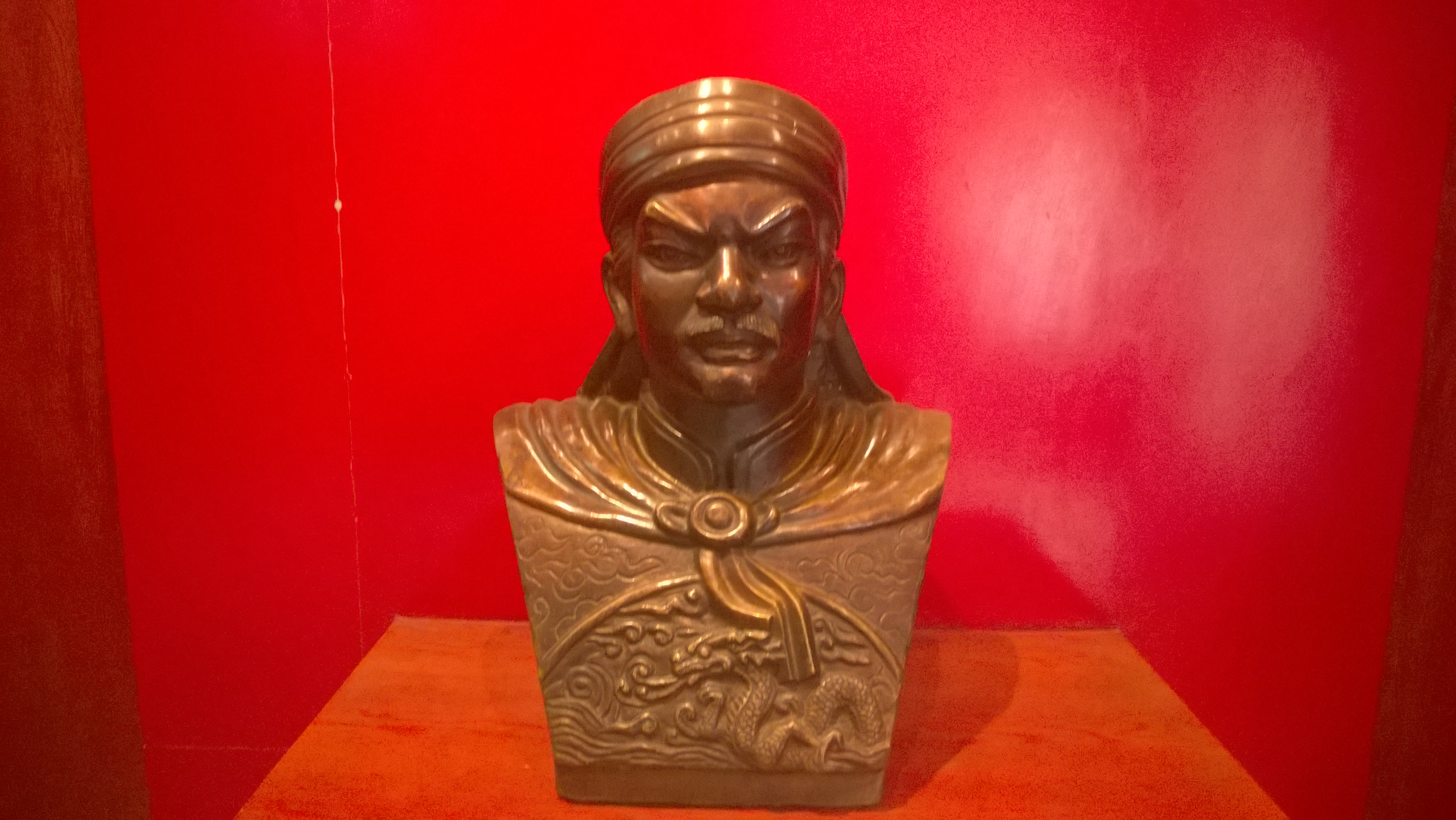
A bust of Trần Hưng Đạo at the Vietnam Military History Museum. Đạo was, an imperial prince of the Trần dynasty, and military commander during the Mongol invasion of Vietnam.

Taken from a placard on the Vietnamese Military History Museum

- 214 – 207 BC: War against the Qin
- 208 – 179 BC: War against the Zhao
- 40 – 43: War against the Eastern Han's domination
- 542 – 548: War against the Liang's domination
- 603: War against the Sui dynasty
- 687 – 905: Resistance war against the Tang dynasty
- 930 – 938: War against the Southern Han
- 1077: War against the Song
- 1258 – 1288: War against the Mongolian
- 1406 – 1427: War against the Ming's domination
- 1785 – 1789: War against the Siam – Qing
- 1858 – 1954: First Indochina War
- 1954 – 1975: Second Indochina War

=== Pre-colonial exhibition ===
This era was highlighted by wars with neighboring countries through the years 214 BC to 1789. A placard details the Vietnamese wars in history. Various artifacts during these years are on display while quotations and murals attributed to previous emperors are arranged on the walls.

=== Vietnam War ===
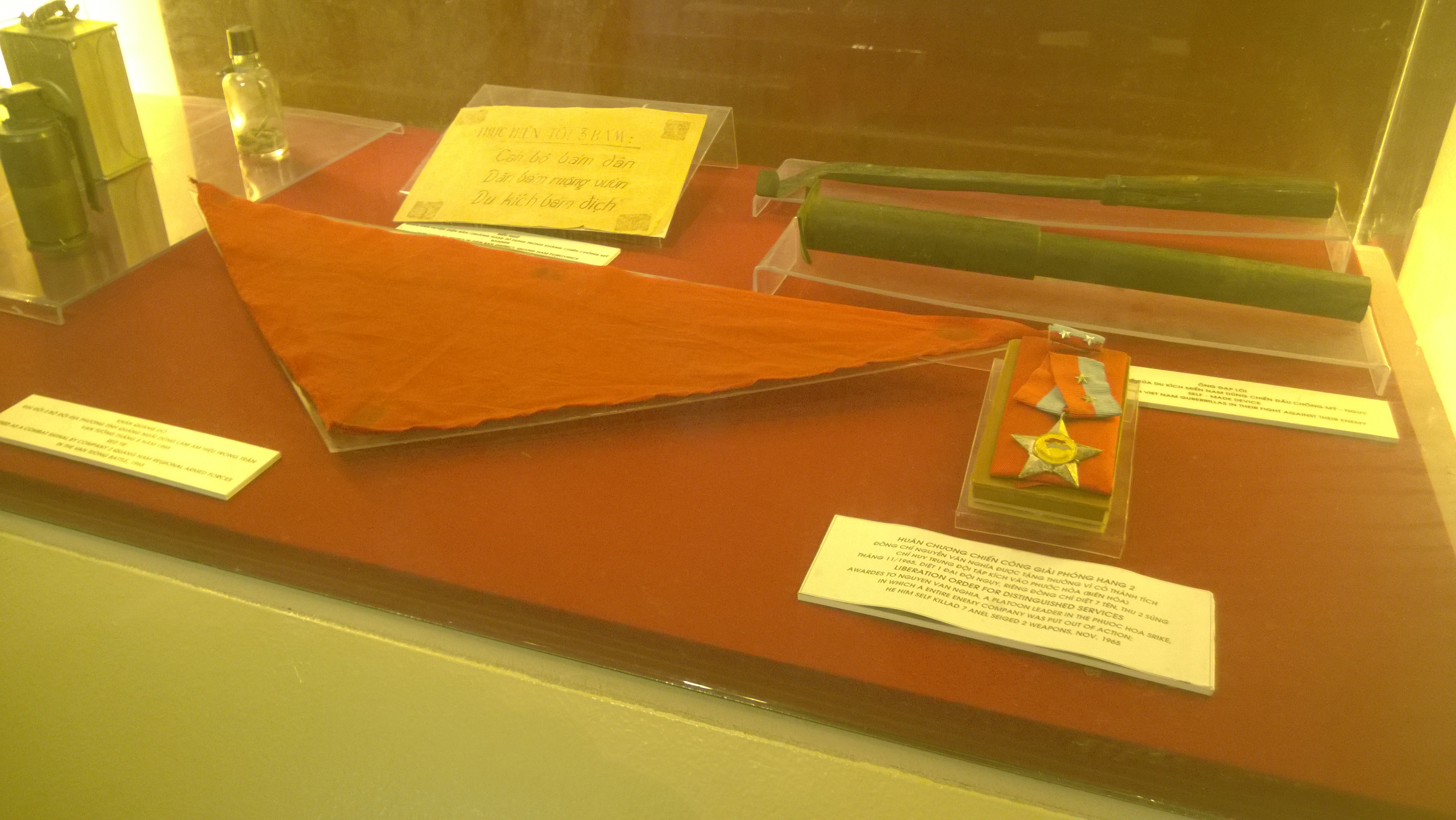
An exhibit holding items from the Vietnam War

There is a wide variety of displays seen in the museum focusing on the Vietnam War through many exhibits presenting information of the tactics of the United States and the different manners in which war was approached in Vietnam.

The museum also has a large compilation of posters, newspapers and pictures demonstrating condemnation of the United States' involvement in the war including countries such as the Democratic Republic of the Congo, North Korea, the Netherlands, Venezuela, and Cuba. The museum also boasts a very large collection of destroyed artillery, helicopters, tanks, and more, named the "Garden of Broken toys."

== Items on outside display ==
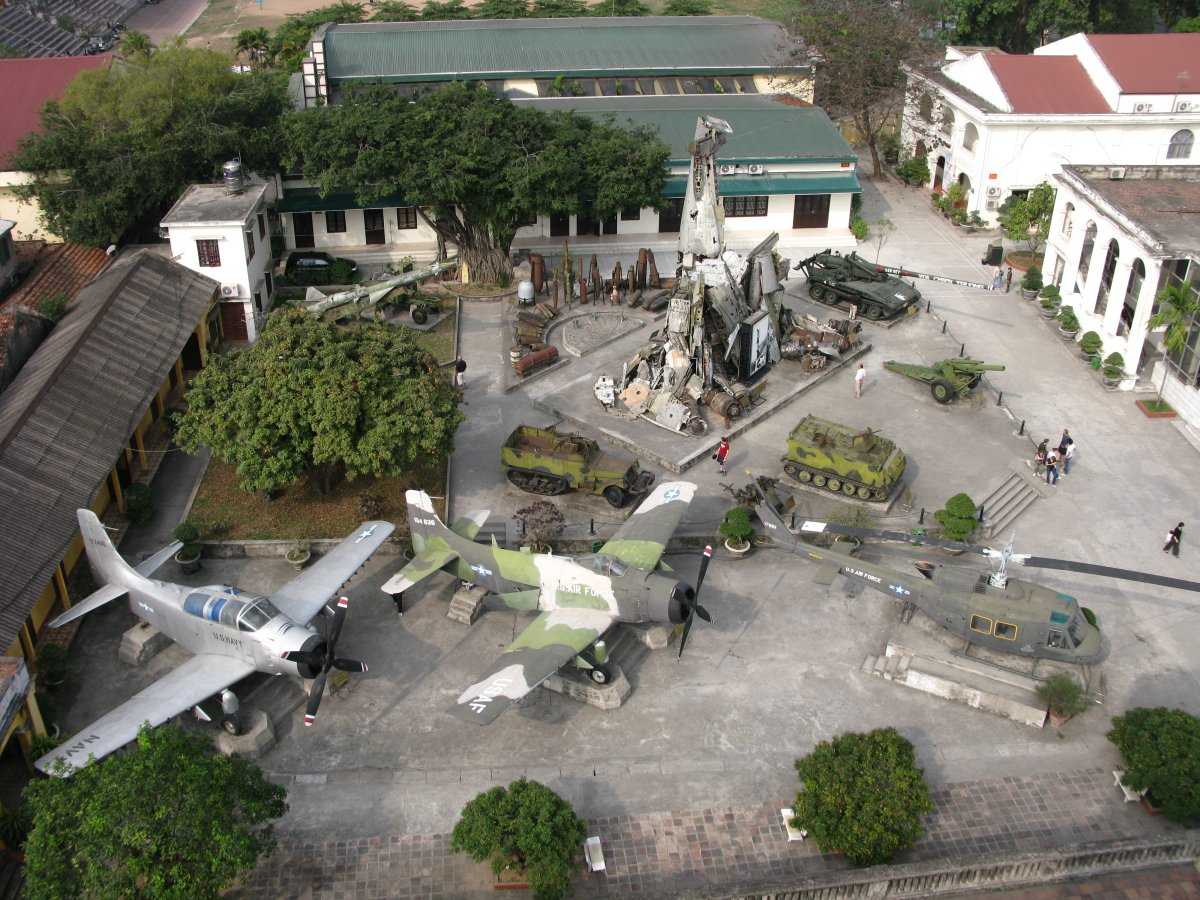
The old museum has a number of decommissioned vehicles on display in its "Garden of Toys"

Items on display include:

- 37 mm automatic air defense gun M1939 (61-K)
- 57 mm AZP S-60
- 85 mm divisional gun D-44
- 130 mm towed field gun M1954 (M-46)
- UH-1H Huey
- Wreckage of a Boeing B-52G Stratofortress shot down during Operation Linebacker II
- Cessna A-37B Dragonfly
- Douglas A-1E and A-1H Skyraiders
- M3 Half-track purportedly used by Groupe Mobile 100 and captured in the Battle of Mang Yang Pass
- M101 howitzer
- M107 Self-Propelled Gun
- M113 armored personnel carrier
- M114 155 mm howitzer
- Mikoyan-Gurevich MiG-21 MF & PFM
- S-75 Dvina SA-2 Guideline SAM
- T-34 tank
- T-54 tank
