= List of The Amazing Race Norge contestants =

This is a list of contestants who have appeared on The Amazing Race Norge, a Norwegian reality competition show based on the American series, The Amazing Race. Contestants with a pre-existing relationship form a team and race across around the world against other teams to claim a prize valued at a worth of NOK 1 million. In total, 42 contestants have appeared in the series.

== Contestants ==
| Name | Occupation | Age | From | Season | Finish |
|---|---|---|---|---|---|
| Kenneth Holt | Rapper | 32 | Oslo | Season 1 | 11th |
| Hakan Pandul | Rapper | 32 | Oslo | Season 1 | 11th |
| Pål Christian Egeberg | Results Guard in Norsk Tipping | 32 | Hamar | Season 1 | 10th |
| Ivar Juliussen | Tutor | 39 | Hamar | Season 1 | 10th |
| Martha Berberg | Caretaker | 22 | Kristiansand | Season 1 | 9th |
| Elise Berberg | Barista | 25 | Kristiansand | Season 1 | 9th |
| Vilde Naomi Enge | Artist | 20 | Oslo | Season 1 | 8th |
| Bjarne Vegard Drevland | Student | 31 | Kragerø | Season 1 | 8th |
| Julie Aamodt | Executive assistant at Fox International Channels | 28 | Oslo | Season 1 | 7th |
| Vichy Ericsson | Bar owner and operator | 30 | Gothenburg, Sweden | Season 1 | 7th |
| Tor Einar Holen | Oil Worker | 42 | Malme | Season 1 | 6th |
| Cathrine Hjemli Holen | Student | 22 | Malme | Season 1 | 6th |
| Kari Hagrud Setsaas | Owns and runs a tourist lodge | 44 | Høvringen | Season 1 | 5th |
| Bjørn Setsaas | Owns and runs a tourist lodge | 64 | Høvringen | Season 1 | 5th |
| Frank Hesmyr Falander | Arts and crafts teacher | 26 | Flatdal | Season 1 | 4th |
| Ivar Hesmyr Falander | Student | 26 | Flatdal | Season 1 | 4th |
| Michelle Holm | Interior Designer | 29 | Holmestrand | Season 1 | 3rd |
| Cathrine Andersen | Medical Secretary | 29 | Oslo | Season 1 | 3rd |
| Karim Sabeur | Waiter | 26 | Oslo | Season 1 | 2nd |
| Khabat Sarzali | Waiter | 27 | Oslo | Season 1 | 2nd |
| Morten Bjerke | General manager of a toy store | 34 | Bodø | Season 1 | 1st |
| Truls Bjerke | General manager of a toy store/Bartender | 30 | Bodø | Season 1 | 1st |
| Allan Wetrhus | | 42 | Kristiansand | Season 2 | 10th |
| Ørjan Heimlid Øvstetun | | 26 | Kristiansand | Season 2 | 10th |
| Milorad Dunderovic | | 59 | Nittedal | Season 2 | 9th |
| Dario Dunderovic | | 22 | Nittedal | Season 2 | 9th |
| Linn Christine "Lindsy" Pedersen | | 21 | Bergen | Season 2 | 8th |
| Priscila Merkesdal | | 23 | Bergen | Season 2 | 8th |
| Vinh Thanh Phung | | 28 | Oslo | Season 2 | 7th |
| Terje Løvgro Stokke | | 29 | Oslo | Season 2 | 7th |
| Eva Skjønhaug | | 49 | Drøbak | Season 2 | 6th |
| Wenche Eriksen | | 50 | Drøbak | Season 2 | 6th |
| Lill Marie Hande | | 33 | Son | Season 2 | 5th |
| Stian Hande | | 33 | Son | Season 2 | 5th |
| Julie Eline Sannerud | | 21 | Oslo | Season 2 | 4th |
| Robert Sømod | | 23 | Oslo | Season 2 | 4th |
| Cecilie Andresen Kreutz | | 41 | Bærum | Season 2 | 3rd |
| Camilla Harner Smith | | 43 | Bærum | Season 2 | 3rd |
| Solfrid Kvalvik | | 37 | Andenes | Season 2 | 2nd |
| Sveinung Ellingsen | | 29 | Andenes | Season 2 | 2nd |
| Omar Ishqair | | 28 | Oslo/Dubai | Season 2 | 1st |
| Bilal Ishqair | | 26 | Oslo/Dubai | Season 2 | 1st |

== See also ==
List of The Amazing Race Norge winners
