= The Amazing Race Celebrity =

The Amazing Race Celebrity may refer to:

- The Amazing Race China, a 2014 Chinese TV series which aired on Shenzhen TV
- The Amazing Race Australia: Celebrity Edition, a 2023 TV season which aired on Network 10

== See also ==
- The Amazing Race (disambiguation)
