= The Amazing Race Norge 2 =

Season of television series

- Season 2
- Presented by: Freddy dos Santos
- No. of teams: 10
- Winners: Omar & Bilal Ishqair
- No. of legs: 12
- Distance traveled: 35,000 km (22,000 mi)
- No. of episodes: 12 (13 including highlights episode)

Release
- Original network: TV 2
- Original release: 6 March – 22 May 2013

Additional information
- Filming dates: November 2012 – December 2012

Series chronology
- ← Previous; Season 1

The Amazing Race Norge 2 is the second season of The Amazing Race Norge, a Norwegian reality competition show based on the American series The Amazing Race. Hosted by Freddy dos Santos, it featured ten teams of two, each with a pre-existing relationship, competing in a race around the Atlantic World to win 500,000 kr and a Subaru Forester for each team member for a total worth of 1,000,000 kr. This season visited three continents and six countries, travelling approximately 35,000 kilometres (22,000 mi) during twelve legs. Starting in Oslo, racers travelled through South Africa, Namibia, Chile, Argentina and Brazil, before returning to Norway and finishing in Kongsberg. New elements introduced in this season include the U-Turn and Intersection, where two teams competed against each other in a task. The season premiered on TV 2 on 6 March 2013 at 20:00 (CEST). The finale aired on 22 May, and a special highlights episode aired on 29 May.

Brothers Omar and Bilal Ishqair were the winners of this season, while cohabitants Solfrid Kvalvik and Sveinung Ellingsen finished in second place and friends Cecilie Kreutz and Camilla Smith finished in third place.

== Production ==
=== Development and filming ===
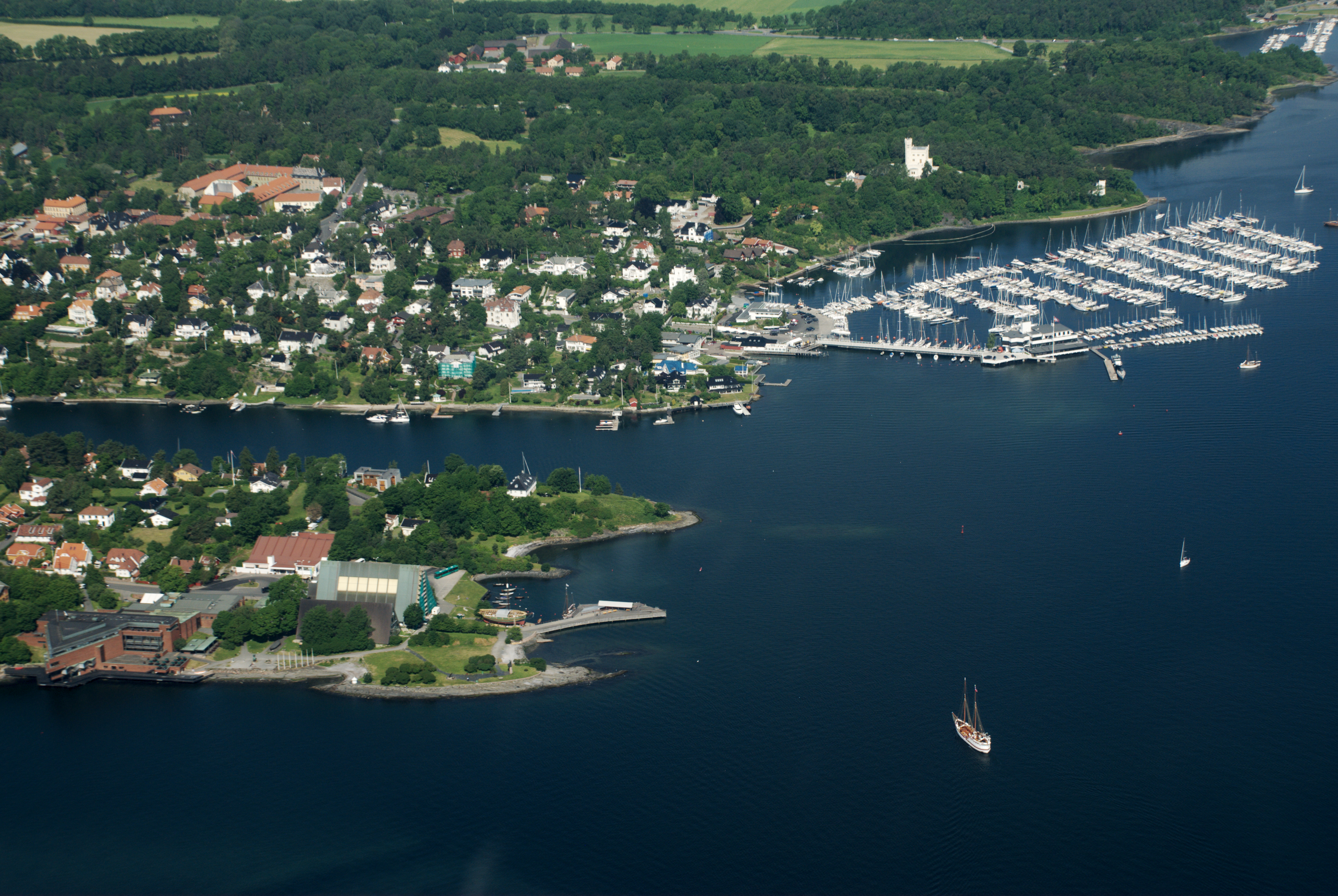
Teams began the second season of The Amazing Race Norge on the Bygdøy peninsula in Oslo.

On 18 August 2012, it was confirmed that Freddy dos Santos would return to present the show. Filming took place from November to December 2012. In this season, if there are two or more teams arriving at the Pit Stop at the same time, though they were not given a tied position, all those teams would depart together at the same time in the next leg, unlike the American version. This case occurred in Leg 2, where the 2nd, 3rd and 4th teams departing at the same time, as well as the 7th and 8th teams. This season also introduced the variant of the Intersection that was also in the second Latin American season, where two teams compete against each other, with the first team winning getting their next clue and the losing team waiting at for another team to redo the challenge. If a team was the last at the Intersection, they had to perform the task one additional time before receiving their next clue.

=== Casting ===
The show began casting on 1 July. with participants required to be at least 18 years old to join. Applications closed on 15 August, and the cast was revealed on 20 November 2012.

=== Marketing ===
The sponsors include Nordea, Hotels.com, Elproffen, Gouda and Subaru.

== Cast ==
Contestants	Age	Relationship	Hometown	Status
Allan Wetrhus	42	Teammates	Kristiansand	Eliminated 1st (in Cape Town, South Africa)
Ørjan Øvstetun	26	Teammates	Kristiansand	Eliminated 1st (in Cape Town, South Africa)
Milorad Dunderovic	59	Father & Son	Nittedal	Eliminated 2nd (in Cape Town, South Africa)
Dario Dunderovic	22	Father & Son	Nittedal	Eliminated 2nd (in Cape Town, South Africa)
Lindsy Pedersen	21	Best Friends	Bergen	Eliminated 3rd (in Khomas Region, Namibia)
Priscila Merkesdal	23	Best Friends	Bergen	Eliminated 3rd (in Khomas Region, Namibia)
Vinh Thanh Phung	28	Mates	Oslo	Eliminated 4th (in Valparaíso, Chile)
Terje Stokke	29	Mates	Oslo	Eliminated 4th (in Valparaíso, Chile)
Eva Skjønhaug	49	Friends	Drøbak	Eliminated 5th (in Mendoza Province, Argentina)
Wenche Eriksen	50	Friends	Drøbak	Eliminated 5th (in Mendoza Province, Argentina)
Lill Hande	33	Married	Son	Eliminated 6th (in Buenos Aires, Argentina)
Stian Hande	33	Married	Son	Eliminated 6th (in Buenos Aires, Argentina)
Julie Sannerud	21	Colleagues	Oslo	Eliminated 7th (in Rio de Janeiro, Brazil)
Robert Sømod	23	Colleagues	Oslo	Eliminated 7th (in Rio de Janeiro, Brazil)
Cecilie Kreutz	41	Friends	Bærum	Third Place
Camilla Smith	43	Friends	Bærum	Third Place
Solfrid Kvalvik	37	Cohabitants	Andenes	Second Place
Sveinung Ellingsen	29	Cohabitants	Andenes	Second Place
Omar Ishqair	28	Brothers	Oslo (Dubai)	Winners
Bilal Ishqair	26	Brothers	Oslo (Dubai)	Winners

== Results ==
The following teams participated in the season, with their relationships at the time of filming. Note that this table is not necessarily reflective of all content broadcast on television due to inclusion or exclusion of some data. Placements are listed in finishing order:

Team	Position (by leg)												Roadblocks performed
Team	1	2	3	4	5	6	7	8+	9	10	11+	12	Roadblocks performed
Omar & Bilal	3rd	7th	2nd	1st	2nd	1st	1st	1st⊃	2nd	1st	2nd⊂	1st	Omar 6, Bilal 6
Solfrid & Sveinung	6th	3rd	3rd	3rd	4th	4th	2nd	2nd	1st	3rd	1st⊃	2nd	Solfrid 6, Sveinung 6
Cecilie & Camilla	7th	5th	4th	4th	3rd	2nd	5th	3rd⊂	4th	4th	3rd−	3rd	Cecilie 6, Camilla 6
Julie & Robert	5th	2nd	1st	2nd	1st	3rd	3rd	4th−	3rd	2nd	4th		Julie 5, Robert 6
Lill & Stian	1st	8th	6th	6th	7th	5th	4th	5th	5th				Lill 5, Stian 3
Wenche & Eva	4th	1st	7th	5th	6th	6th	6th						Eva 3, Wenche 4
Vinh & Terje	2nd	4th	5th	7th	5th	7th							Vinh 4, Terje 2
Priscila & Lindsy	8th	6th	8th										Priscila 1, Lindsy 2
Milorad & Dario	9th	9th											Milorad 1, Dario 1
Allan & Ørjan	10th												Allan 0, Ørjan 0^{1}

Key

- A red team placement indicates that the team was eliminated.
- An underlined blue team placement indicates that the team came in last on a non-elimination leg and were penalised with a Handicap (Handikap) in the next leg.
- A brown ⊃ means the team chose to use a U-Turn; ⊂ indicates the team who received it.
- An orange + indicates that there was an Intersection in that leg, while an orange − indicates which team lost the Intersection task and received a penalty.
- An underlined leg number indicates that there was no mandatory rest period at the Pit Stop and all teams were ordered to continue racing, except for the last team to arrive, who was eliminated. The first place team was still awarded a prize for that leg.

Notes

1. Allan & Ørjan were not shown performing the Roadblock and were simply shown checking into the Pit Stop. It is unknown who performed the Roadblock on Leg 1.

== Prizes ==
Individual prizes were awarded to the first team to complete certain legs.

- Leg 5 – 15,000 kr gift certificate from Hotels.com
- Leg 6 – 15,000 kr gift certificate from Hotels.com
- Leg 9 – 10,000 kr gift certificate from Hotels.com
- Leg 10 – 10,000 kr gift certificate from Hotels.com
- Leg 12 – 500,000 kr from Nordea and a Subaru Forester for each team member.

== Race summary ==
Route map

Destinations	Air travel Rail travel Water travel Bus travel Helicopter travel Bicycle travel Gondola travel
Route Markers	Veivalg (Detour) Veisperring (Roadblock) Veikryss (Intersection); U-Sving (U-Turn) Handikap (Handicap) Pitstop (Pit Stop)

=== Leg 1 (Norway → South Africa) ===
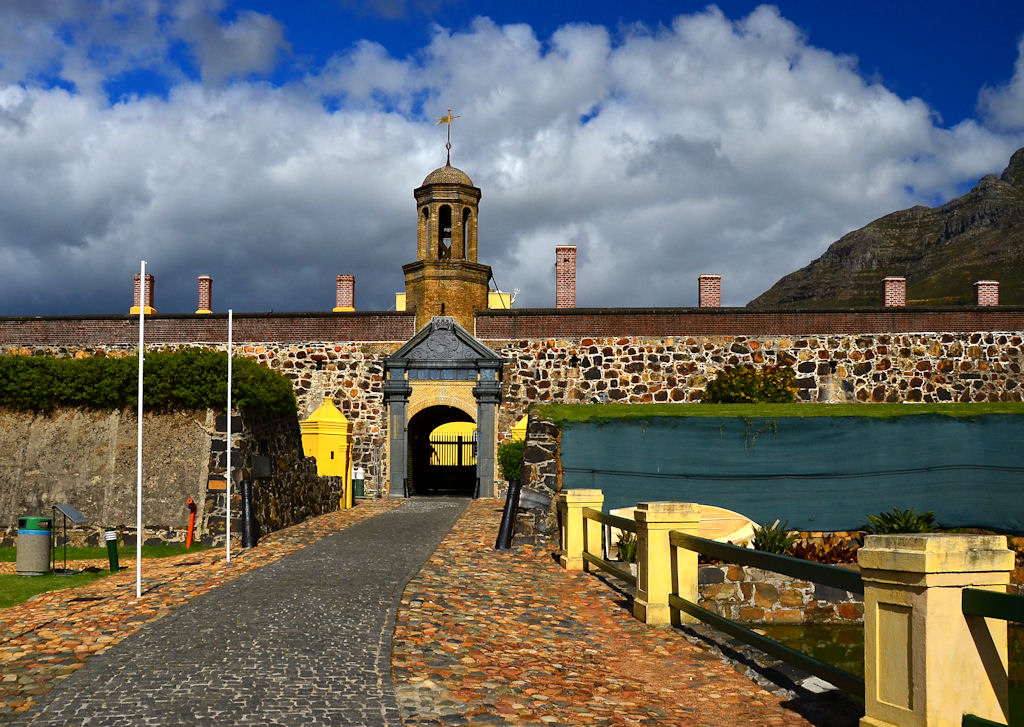
Cape Town's Castle of Good Hope, the first Pit Stop on the second Norwegian Amazing Race.

- Episode 1 (6 March 2013)
- Eliminated: Allan & Ørjan

Locations

- Oslo, Norway (Bygdøy – Maritime Statue) (Starting Line)
- Oslo (Fram Museum)
- Oslo (Sentrum – ONEPARK Sentrum P-Hus)
- Oslo (Karl Johans Gate)
- Oslo (Nobel Peace Center)
- Oslo (Oslo Airport, Gardermoen) → Cape Town, South Africa (Cape Town International Airport)
- Cape Town (Victoria & Alfred Waterfront – Nobel Square)
- Cape Town (Langa Township – Simons Curio)
- Cape Town (Short Market Street – Heritage Square)
- Cape Town (Castle of Good Hope)

Episode summary

- Teams began the race on the Bygdøy peninsula and were instructed to search the polar ship Fram in the Fram Museum for their next clue. From the museum, teams had to drive to the ONEPARK Sentrum P-Hus and find a marked parking spot with their next clue. Teams then had to travel on foot to Karl Johans gate, find a man named Jan Egil and buy an Erlik Oslo magazine, which displayed the location of their next clue: the Nobel Peace Center. From the peace center, teams had to travel by public transportation to Oslo Airport, Gardermoen, where they had to find a board and place their team picture.
- From Oslo, teams had to fly to Cape Town, South Africa. Once there, teams were given their next clue outside the airport from a man named Shiraz in five-minute intervals based on their arrival at Gardermoen sending them to Nobel Square. There, teams had to answer a six-question quiz about Nobel Prize winners with each correct answer giving teams a letter that spelled the word ubuntu. When teams got the right word, they could say it in exchange for their next clue.
- From Nobel Square, teams had to travel by taxi to Simons Curio in Langa Township, where they had to learn and perform a gumboot dance to the satisfaction of their instructor to receive the next clue. Teams then had to travel to Heritage Square and buy a postcard with a written note from Freddy. The note told them to go to the place on the postcard: the Castle of Good Hope.
- In this season's first Roadblock, one team member had to find the right key from a large key ring that opened a cell door containing their next clue, which directed them to check in at the nearby Pit Stop.

=== Leg 2 (South Africa) ===
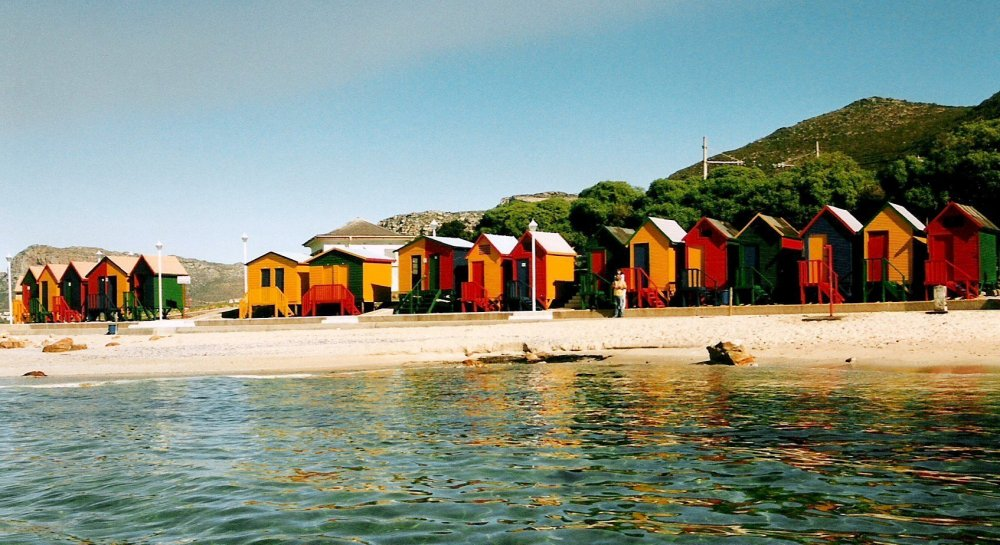
In the Roadblock, teams had to build South African-style beach houses on Muizenberg's beach.

- Episode 2 (13 March 2013)
- Eliminated: Milorad & Dario

Locations

- Cape Town (Table Mountain)
- Cape Town (Muizenberg Beach)
- Cape Town (Kalk Bay Harbour)
- Cape Town (Masiphumelele – Parking)
- Cape Town (Masiphumelele – Masiphumelele Cellphone & Take-Away)
- Cape Town (Chapman's Peak)

Episode summary

- At the start of this leg atop Table Mountain, teams had to photograph four different kinds of flowers using a tablet computer to receive their next clue. Teams then had to take the Table Mountain Aerial Cableway down the mountain, choose a car with a cooler that teams had to carry during the leg containing a sheep head known as a "Smiley" and drive to Muizenberg Beach to find their next clue.
- In this leg's Roadblock, one team member would receive three numbers corresponding to three beach houses and had to recreate three beach houses using wooden puzzle pieces to receive their next clue.
- After the Roadblock, teams had to drive to Kalk Beach Harbour and find the fishmonger Ferial, who had their next clue.
- This season's first Detour was a choice between Count (Telle) or Peel (Pelle). In Count, teams had to count two different kinds of fish submerged in a container full of ice (13 black and 17 red) to receive their next clue. In Peel, teams had to gut 15 fish and string them up for sale to receive their next clue.
- After the Detour, teams had to drive to Masiphumele and ride bicycles to the Masiphumele Cellphone & Take-away store. Once there, teams had to exchange the sheep's head they had brought with them throughout the leg for a cooked head that each team member had to eat half of before receiving their next clue. Teams then had to drive to Chapman's Peak and find a major with their next clue instructing them to fire a cannon before checking into the Pit Stop.

=== Leg 3 (South Africa → Namibia) ===
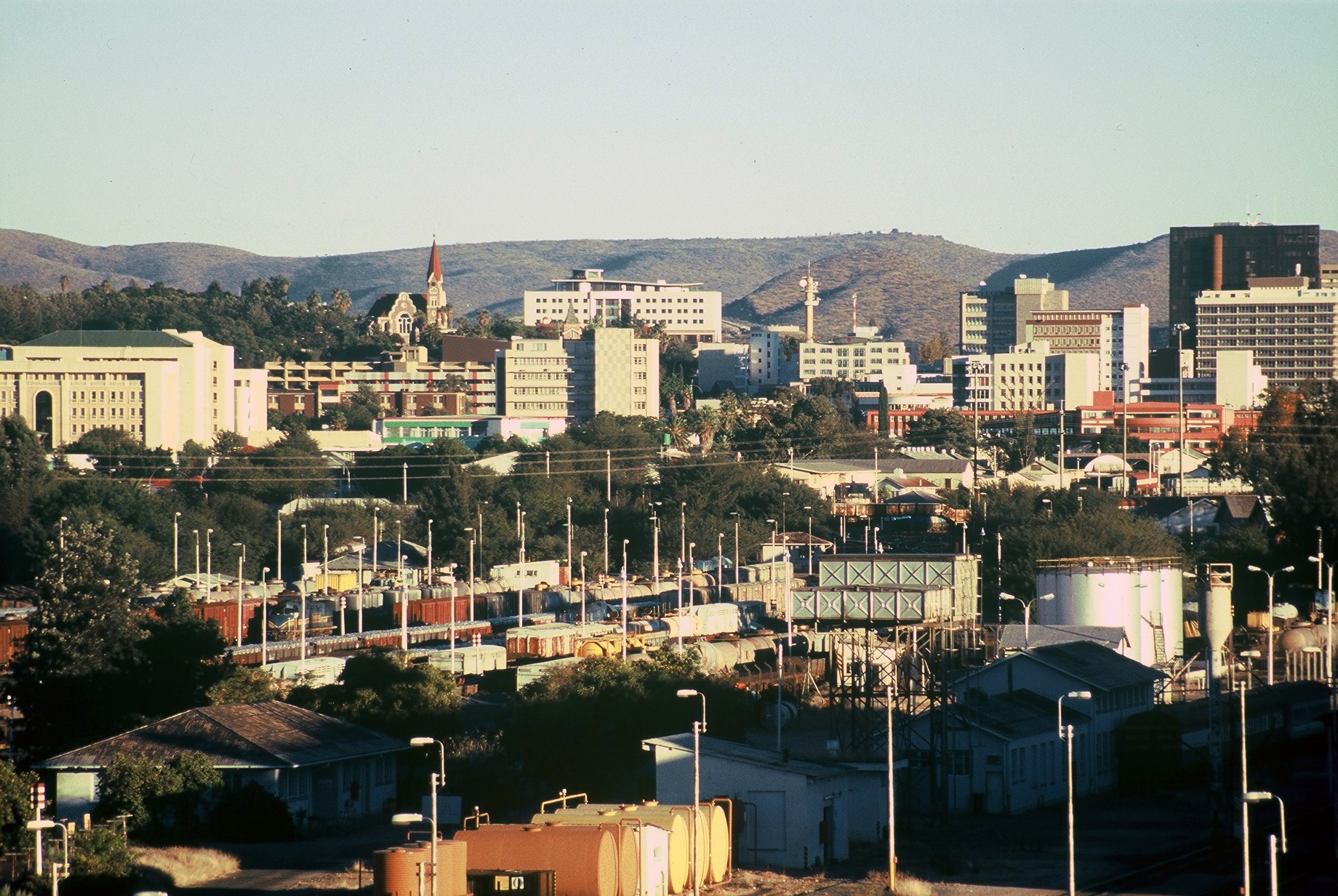
Most of the tasks in Leg 3 took place in Windhoek, the capital city of Namibia.

- Episode 2 (20 March 2013)
- Eliminated: Priscila & Lindsy

Locations

- Cape Town (Protea Hotel Fire & Ice!)
- Cape Town (Cape Town International Airport) → Windhoek, Namibia (Hosea Kutako International Airport)
- Kappsfarm (Trophäendienste Taxidermy & Curios)
- Windhoek (Katutura – Etyapa Tyre Repair)
- Windhoek (Katutura – Oshetu Community Open Market)
- Windhoek (Matteus' Woodchopping or Tangeni Car Wash)
- Khomas Region (Okapuka Game Reserve)
- Khomas Region (Otjihavera Railway Station)

Episode summary

- At the start of this leg, teams were instructed to drive to Cape Town International Airport, find an elephant statue and place their team picture on a board. Teams then had to fly to Windhoek, Namibia. Once there, teams had to travel by taxi to Trophäendienste Taxidermy & Curios and identify a series of skins to their animals to receive their next clue. The number of skins the teams had to identify was based on the order in which they arrived at Cape Town International Airport. The first three teams (Eva & Wenche, Julie & Robert, Solfrid & Sveinung) had to only identify two skins. The next two (Cecille & Camilia, Vinh & Terje) had to identify four skins and the last three (Omar & Bilal, Lill & Stian, Priscila & Lindsy) had to identify six animals skins.
- Teams then had to travel to Etyapa Tyre Repair, buy a tyre and remove the rim. After, teams had to bring the tyre to a nearby shop to receive their next clue. There, teams were given cut-up tyre pieces that they had to make into sandals. Teams then had to wear don their sandals and walk to the Oshetu Community Open Market to receive their next clue.
- This leg's Detour was a choice between Chop (Hugge) or Scrub (Skrubbe). In Chop, teams had chop 25 pieces of wood to receive their next clue. In Skrubbe, teams had to wash and scrub a car to receive their next clue.
- After the Detour, teams had to travel by shuttle bus to the Okapuka Game Reserve and then board a safari vehicle that would take them into the reserve. There, teams had to gather animal droppings that they would need for the Roadblock before continuing to the Otjihavera Railway Station.
- In this leg's Roadblock, one team member had to play bokdrool by spitting a dung pellet alongside a train and placing a stick where it landed. Then, they would have to spit another pellet, pick up the stick and repeat until they reached the Pit Stop.

=== Leg 4 (Namibia) ===
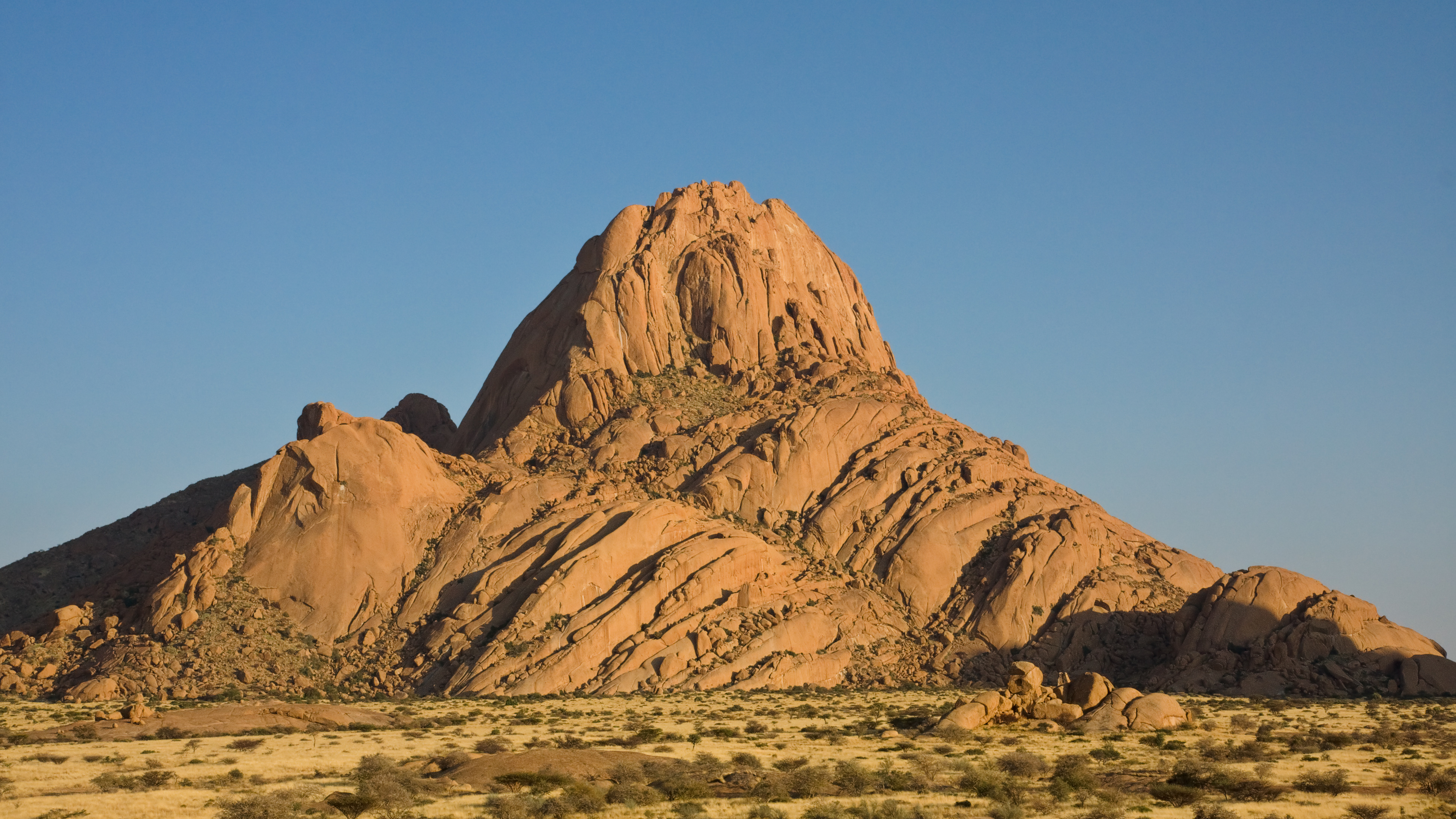
This leg had teams travelling to the Namib Desert. Pictured is the Spitzkoppe where a number of tasks took place in the mountain range and the village nearby.

- Episode 4 (27 March 2013)

Locations

- Khomas Region (Otjihavera Railway Station) → Erongo Region (Stingbank Railway Siding)
- Spitzkoppe (Store)
- Spitzkoppe (Spitzkoppe Primary School)
- Spitzkoppe (Bushman Paradise)
- Spitzkoppe (Small Bushman Paradise)
- Erongo Region (Khan River)
- Erongo Region (Haigamkab)
- Erongo Region (Moonscape Canyon – Viewpoint)
- Erongo Region (Moonscape Canyon)

Episode summary

- During the Pit Stop, teams were transported by TransNamib train into the Namib Desert. At the start of this leg after being released from the train, teams were instructed to attach a tyre to a pickup truck. Teams then had to drive to the store in Spitzkoppe, where they receive pieces of cloth along with their next clue.
- In this leg's Roadblock, one team member had to learn five words in the local San language from schoolchildren using pictures on the cloths given to them at the store to receive them their next clue.
- After the Roadblock, teams had to hike up to the Bushman Paradise, where they had to make the paint used in San rock paintings to receive their next clue. Teams then had to hike to the Small Bushman Paradise and find their next clue in their vehicle. From Spitzkoppe, teams had to drive to the Khan River, gather two ostrich eggs that they would need for the Detour and drive to Haigamkab to retrieve their next clue.
- This leg's Detour was a choice between Save Water (Spare Vann) or Boiling Water (Koke Vann). In Save Water, teams had to draw underground water using a straw bored into the ground and then transfer the water into their ostrich eggs. After filling the eggs with water, teams had to cover the hole in the eggs using straw and bury them underground to receive their next clue. In Boiling Water, teams had to start a fire using sticks and boil water. They then had to transfer their water to their ostrich eggs to receive their next clue.
- After the Detour, teams had to drive to Moonscape Canyon and find a clue hidden underneath seven out of 250 blankets. Teams had to carry any blanket they picked up. When teams found their clue, they could check in at the Pit Stop.

Additional note

- This was a non-elimination leg.

=== Leg 5 (Namibia → Chile) ===
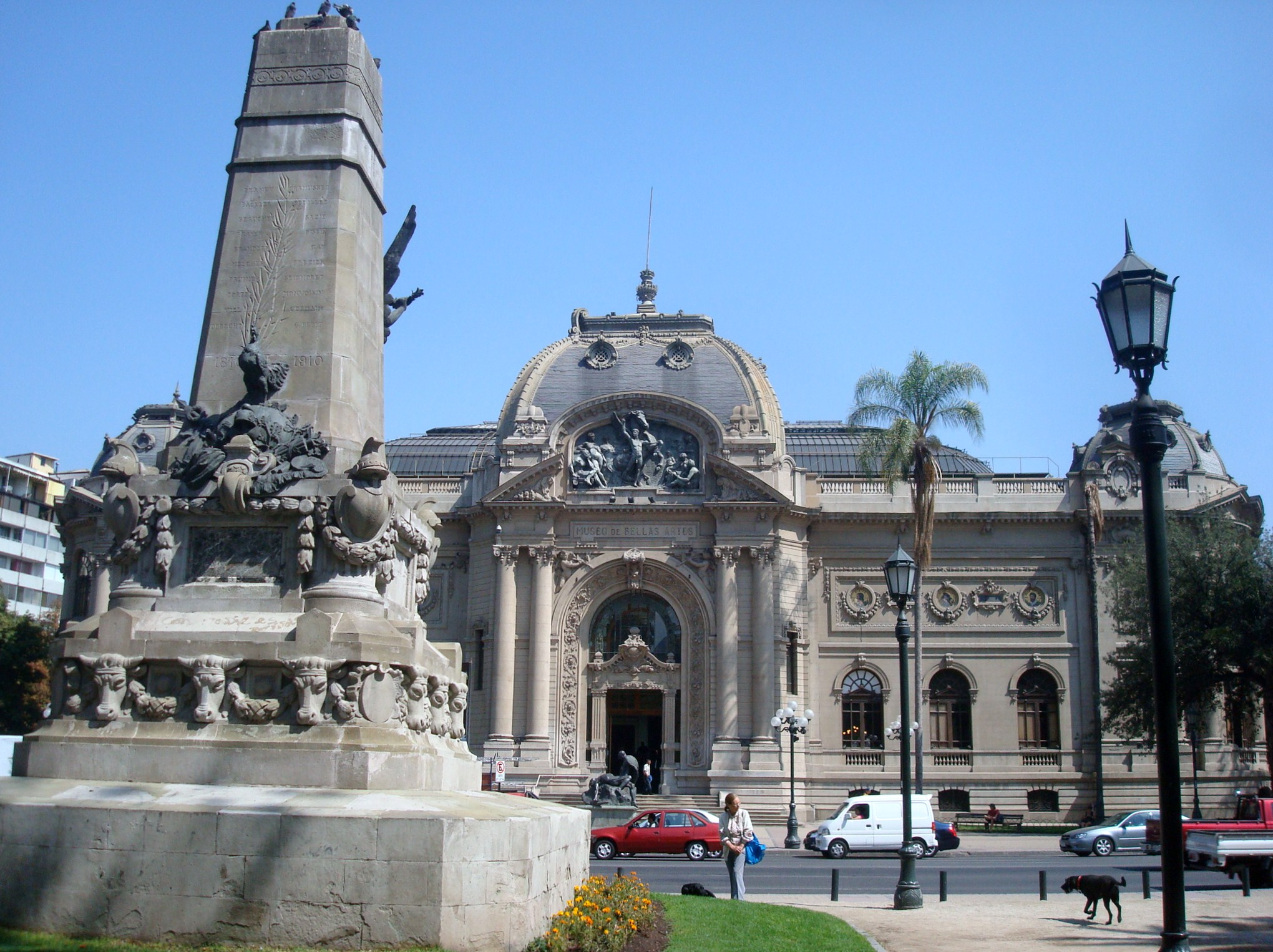
The Chilean National Museum of Fine Arts served as the Pit Stop for this leg.

Airdate: 3 April 2013

- Windhoek (Hosea Kutako International Airport) → Santiago, Chile (Arturo Merino Benítez International Airport)
- Pudahuel (Arturo Merino Benítez International Airport) → Santiago (Palacio de La Moneda)
- Santiago (Plaza de la Constitución)
- Santiago (Paseo Ahumada)
- Santiago (Santa Lucía Hill)
- Santiago (Cerro Calán (in Spanish) – National Astronomical Observatory)
- Santiago (Mall Sport)
- Santiago (Parque Forestal)
- Santiago (Parque Forestal – Museo Nacional de Bellas Artes)

In this leg's Roadblock, one team member had to stand behind a kiosk and shake one kilogram (2.2 lb) of nuts and prepare them for sale to the satisfaction of the vendor to receive their next clue.

This leg's Detour was a choice between Henge Høyt (Hanging High) or Stable Drøyt (Rough Stability). In Henge Høyt, both team member had to complete an aerial obstacle course to receive their next clue. In Stable Drøyt, teams had to stack two pyramids of golf balls to receive next clue.

Additional tasks

- At Hosea Kutako International Airport, teams had to place their picture on a board in the order of their arrival.
- Upon arrival in Santiago, teams had to locate Fernandes, who would give them their next clue and would escort teams to their bus that would take them to La Moneda Palace. Teams were given their next clue ten minutes apart from each other in the order of their arrival at Hosea Kutako International Airport. Omar & Bilal departed first; Julie & Robert, second; Cecilie & Camillia, third; Solfrid & Sveinung, fourth; Eva & Wenche, fifth; Lill Marie & Stian, sixth; Vinh & Terje, last, 60 minutes after the first team.
- At La Moneda, teams had to figure out that their next clue was on a message being flashed on a screen at the nearby Torre Entel. This message instructed teams to search behind the Presidential Palace to find their next clue at Plaza de la Constitución.
- At Santa Lucía Hill, teams had to search for a Roman numeral-numbered cannonball near the hill's six cannons and carry them all the way to the top of the hill to receive their next clue.
- At the National Astronomical Observatory, teams had to memorize the astrological signs of the Zodiac. Once they think they have memorized the symbols, they may proceed to the observatory where they would need to match the symbols with the name of the Zodiac to receive their next clue. For Vinh & Terje's Handicap, they not only had to memorize the symbols but they also needed to know the names and their correct sequencing.
- At Parque Forestal, each team member had to successfully play with a traditional Chilean toy called Emboque. It consists of a stick and small knob with a hole attached to the stick by a string. The main goal of the game is to get the knob off the stick, flip, and back onto the stick. If both team members were successful, they would get their next clue and could run to the Pit Stop.

=== Leg 6 (Chile) ===
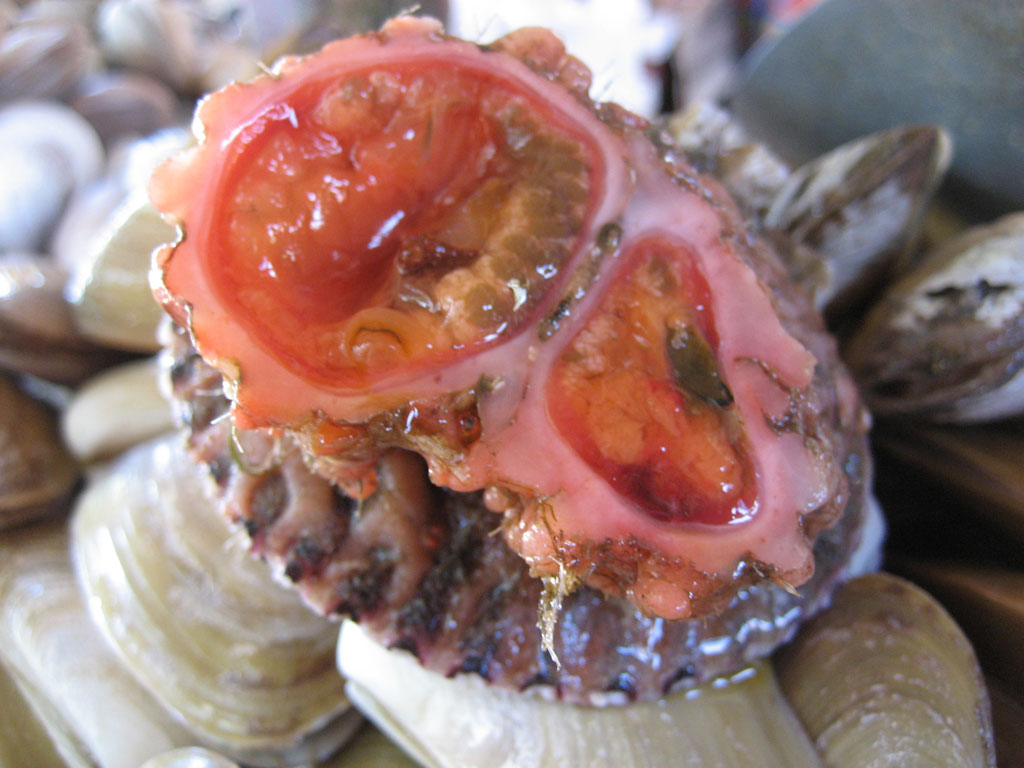
At Caleta Portales, teams had to eat piure to receive their next clue.

Airdate: 10 April 2013

- Santiago (Parque Forestal)
- Santiago (Terminal Alameda (in Spanish)) → Valparaíso
- Valparaíso (The Old Train)
- Valparaíso (Caleta Portales (in Spanish))
- Viña del Mar (Sundial)
- Valparaíso (Parque Cultural de Valparaíso (in Spanish))
- Valparaíso (Pasaje L. Bavestrello)
- Valparaíso (Paseo Yugoslavo)

This leg's Detour was a choice between Klatre (Climb) or Klatte (Daub). In Klatre, one team member had to perform an acrobatic exercise, while the other team member had to climb five metres (16 ft) on a rope to receive their next clue. In Klatte, teams had to color a painting using the paint by number system to receive their next clue.

In this leg's Roadblock, one team member had to correctly play the chorus of "El Cóndor Pasa" on a pan flute before their team could check in at the Pit Stop.

Additional tasks

- At the Old Train, teams had to search inside the train for a picture of Freddy holding a sign with the name of the next destination.
- At Caleta Portales, teams had to eat a piure to receive their next clue. For their Handicap, Lill & Stan had to eat two piure.
- At the sundial in Viña del Mar, teams had to walk a lap around the dial in exactly 60 seconds without using a clock as aid to receive their next clue.

=== Leg 7 (Chile → Argentina) ===
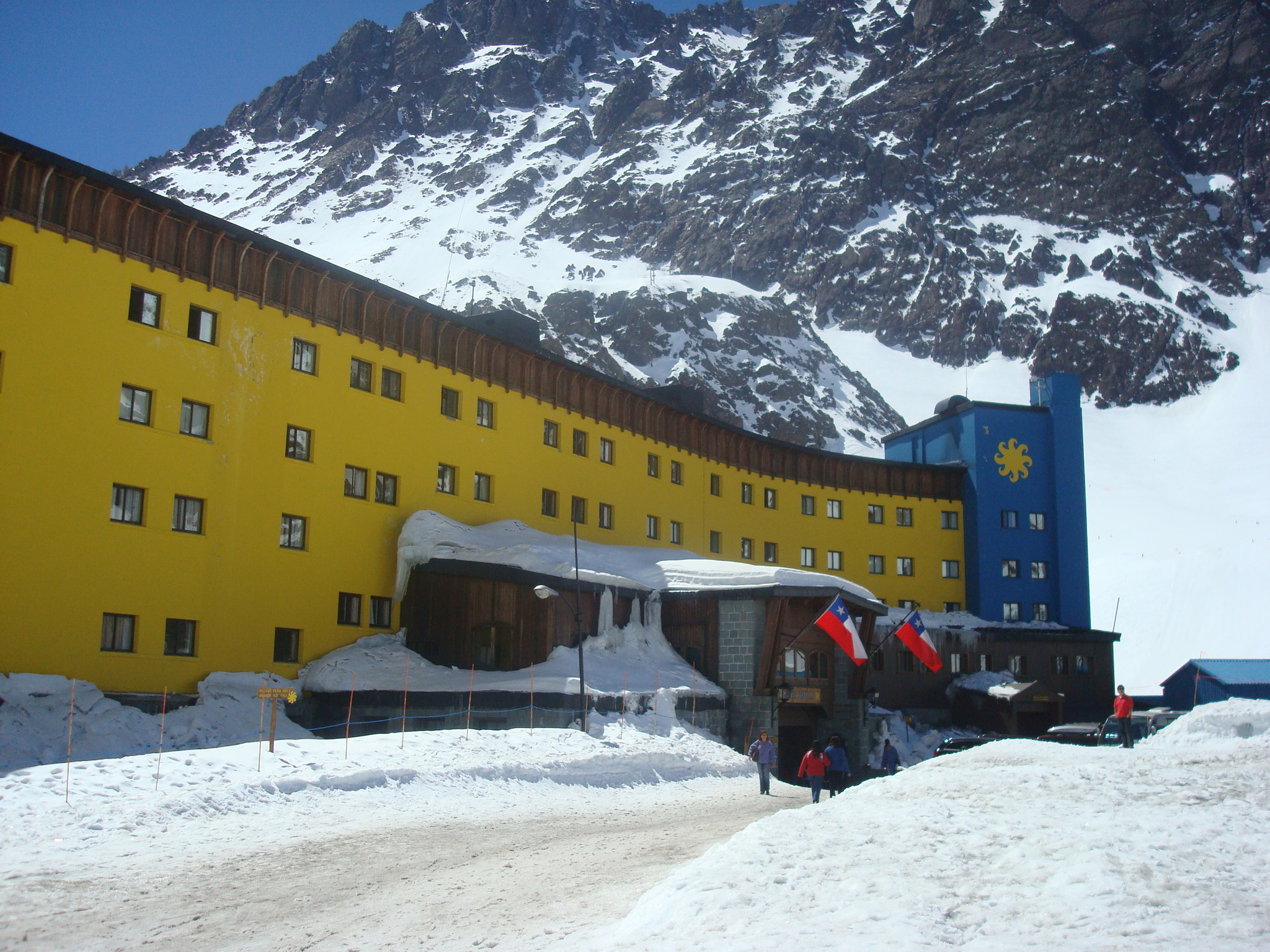
During the leg, teams visited Portillo Hotel to perform additional tasks to receive their next clue.

Airdate: 17 April 2013

- Valparaíso (Paseo Yugoslavo)
- Valparaíso (Intersection of Avenida Brazil & Edward Street) → Los Andes (Los Andes Bus Terminal)
- San Esteban (In Situ Family Vineyards)
- San Esteban (Casa e`Campo Restaurant)
- Valparaíso Region (Portillo Hotel)
- Valparaíso Region (Laguna del Inca)
- Las Cuevas, Argentina (Las Cuevas Avalanche)
- Mendoza Province (Aconcagua Provincial Park)

In this leg's Roadblock, one team member had to make wine by mixing Cabernet Sauvignon (65%), Petit Verdot (30%) and Carménère (5%). When the mixture was approved by the taste-tasters, racers had to pour the wine poured into a bottle, seal the stopper with wax and label the bottle to receive their next clue from a winemaker.

This leg's Detour was a choice between Opptur (Upturn) or Nedtur (Downturn). In Opptur, teams had to carry a 20-kilogram (44 lb) sack to a climber, sitting 120 meters above where the teams started to get the next clue. In Nedtur, teams ascended 230 metres (750 ft) to grab a rope, and had to supply the rope for the climber to get the next clue

Additional tasks

- After teams finished the Roadblock, they had to deliver the wine to the restaurant owner Gino to get the key to the next clue.
- Inside the Portillo Hotel, teams had to deliver two shirts to room 629, then teams had to fetch bread from the bakery and finally had to deliver two drinks from the bar to the couple on the balcony. After the teams had done the tasks, they had to search with binoculars for the next clue.
- The teams had to paddle a kayak from Laguna del Inca and back to Portillo Hotel.
- Before checking into the Pit Stop, teams had to load supplies onto mules. When the pack was approved, they had to go with the mule to the Pit Stop.

=== Leg 8 (Argentina) ===
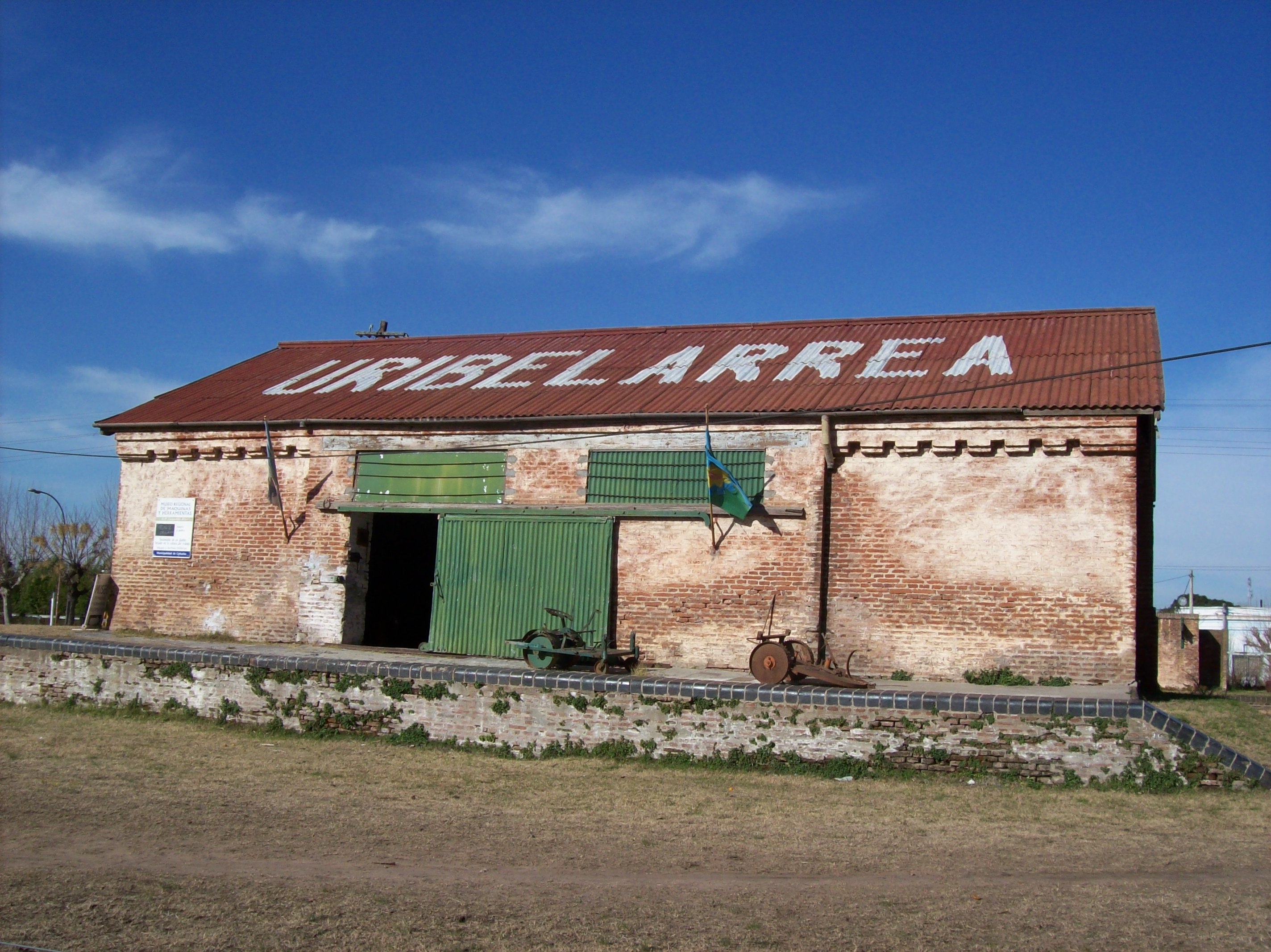
Uribelarrea in the Pampas Region was the location for Leg 8.

- Episode 8 (24 April 2013)

Locations

- Mendoza Province (Aconcagua Provincial Park)
- Uribelarrea (Uribelarrea Train Station (in Spanish))
- Uribelarrea (La Pulpería de Uribe)
- Uribelarrea (El Palenque Restaurant)
- Uribelarrea (Escuela Agrotécnica Salesiana Don Bosco)
- Uribelarrea (Avenida Estancia La Figura)
- Uribelarrea (Avenida Estancia La Figura – BBQ)
- Uribelarrea (Avenida Estancia La Figura – Field)
- Uribelarrea (Avenida Estancia La Figura – Ranch Garden)

Episode summary

- At the start of this leg, teams were instructed to drive to the town of Uribelarrea and find a man named Guido with their next clue at the train station. Teams then had to travel on foot to La Pulpería de Uribe and buy two calabash mate cups, two bombilla and a bag of yerba mate. Once bought, they had to deliver their items to a group of gauchos outside El Palenque Restaurant, where they had to mix their yerba mate with water and drink it to receive their next clue.
- From the restaurant, teams had to travel to Escuela Agrotécnica Salesiana Don Bosco, where they had to separate 10 red marked cows from a group of cows and move them to a pen to receive their next clue. Teams then had to find the feeding station, where they had to fill up bags with at least 50 kilograms (110 lb) of animal food. Once complete, teams had to transport the bags using a horse to Avenida Estancia La Figura to receive their next clue. If teams had less than 50 kilograms (110 lb) of food when it was weighed at the estancia, they had to go back to the feeding station.
- For this series' first Intersection, two teams had to compete against each other in a traditional gaucho challenge. First, one team member had to ride a horse through a barrel racing course. Then, the second team member had to ride the same course and spear a ring at the end of the course using a stick. The first team to spear the ring received their next clue, while the losing team had to wait for another team. The last team had to complete the task an additional time before they could continue racing.
- This leg's Detour was a choice between Food (Mat) or Guts (Inmat). In Food, teams had to eat two kilograms (4.4 lb) of beef to receive their next clue. In Guts, teams had to eat one kilogram (2.2 lb) of cow innards to receive their next clue.
- In this leg's Roadblock, one team member had to use a lasso to rope a wooden horse and pull it towards them to receive their next clue, which directed them to the Pit Stop.

Additional notes

- Omar & Bilal chose to use the U-Turn on Cecilie & Camilla.
- This was a non-elimination leg.

=== Leg 9 (Argentina) ===
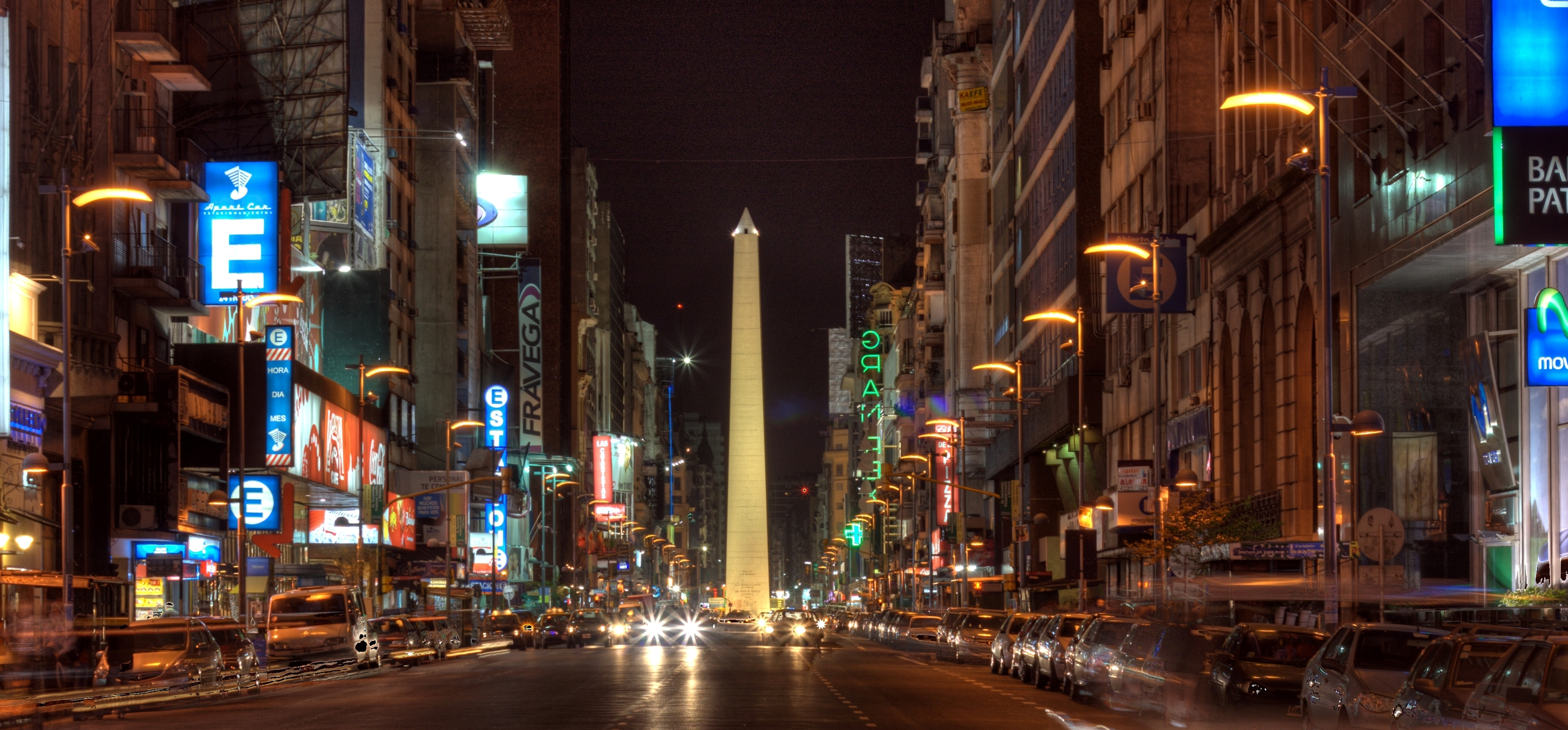
While in Buenos Aires, teams visited Avenida Corrientes where they had to put together 50 copies of the Clarín newspaper.

- Episode 9 (1 May 2013)
- Prize: A 10,000 kr gift certificate from Hotels.com (awarded to Solfrid & Sveinung)
- Eliminated: Lill & Stian

Locations

- Uribelarrea (Avenida Estancia La Figura – Ranch Garden)
- Buenos Aires (Devoto Station → Retiro Railway Station)
- Buenos Aires (Avenida 9 de Julio – Ministry of Health Building)
- Buenos Aires (Libertador Bookstore)
- Buenos Aires (Confitería Ideal (in Spanish))
- Buenos Aires (Simo Confitería)
- Buenos Aires (Avenida Corrientes – Newspaper Store)
- Buenos Aires (Plaza San Martín)
- Buenos Aires (Gobierno de la Ciudad de Buenos Aires (in Spanish))

Episode summary

- At the start of this leg, teams were instructed to drive to Devoto Station in Buenos Aires and then travel by train to the Retiro railway station. Once there, teams had to find next clue beneath a building with an image of Eva Perón on its facade – the Ministry of Health Building. Teams then had to travel to the Libertador Bookstore, search for the book Buenos Aires Baila Tango - Guia de Milongas and flip to page 97 to find the address of their next destination.
- In this leg's Roadblock, one team member had to perform a two-minute Argentine tango to receive their next clue.
- This leg's Detour was a choice between Gold in the Mouth (Gull i Munn) or Silver at the Bottom (Sølv i Bunn). In Gold in the Mouth, teams would have baked 50 croissants to receive their next clue. In Silver at the Bottom, teams had to sell 50 croissants at $2 apiece to receive their next clue. All teams chose Silver at the Bottom. For their Handicap, Lill & Stian had to sell 100 croissants and earn $200 to receive their next clue.
- After the Detour, teams had to find a newspaper store on Avenida Corrientes and insert four supplements into 50 copies of the newspaper Clarín to receive their next clue. Teams then had to travel to Plaza San Martín and take on the job of dog walking. They had to walk ten dogs with same colour on their collar to Gobierno de la Ciudad de Buenos Aires to receive their next clue, which instructed to check in at the Pit Stop on the building's roof.

Additional note

- Although the last team to arrive at the Pit Stop was eliminated, there was no rest period at the end of the leg and all remaining teams were instead instructed to continue racing.

=== Leg 10 (Argentina) ===
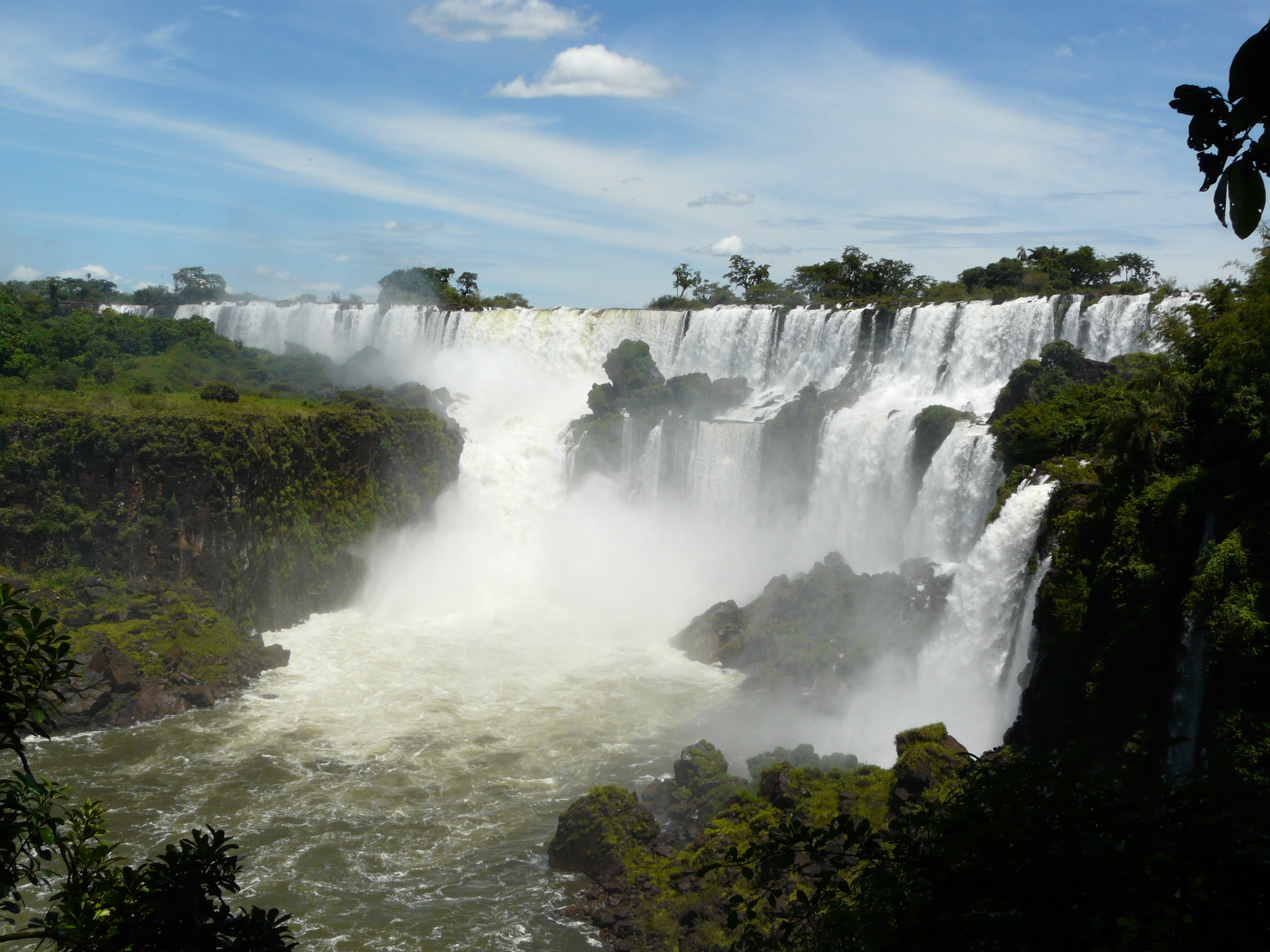
Iguazu Falls was the Pit Stop on the tenth leg.

- Episode 10 (8 May 2013)
- Prize: A 10,000 kr gift certificate from Hotels.com (awarded to Omar & Bilal)

Locations

- Buenos Aires (Club de Pescadores)
- Buenos Aires (Aeroparque Jorge Newbery) → Puerto Iguazú (Cataratas del Iguazú International Airport)
- Puerto Iguazú (Iguazú Port → Hidden Beach)
- Puerto Iguazú (Granja de Ceros)
- Puerto Iguazú (Fort Mbororé Aboriginal Community)
- Puerto Iguazú (Base del Ejército Argentino)
- Iguazú National Park (Iguazu Falls – Lower Trail Lookout)

Episode summary

- At the start of this leg, teams were instructed to travel to Club de Pescadores and place their team picture on a board. Teams then had to fly to Puerto Iguazú. Once there, teams found their next clue outside of the airport, where in the same order as they arrived at the airport in Buenos Aires teams had to draw two maps of Puerto Iguazú and Iguazú National Park that they would use during the leg. Once complete, teams had to travel by taxi to Iguazú's port and find a man named Fredico with their next clue. Teams then had to travel by boat down the Paraná River to Granja de Ceros, where they had to catch a pig, put it in a bag and deliver it to the Guaraní village chief in the neighbouring village to receive their next clue.
- This leg's Detour was a choice between Harvest (Høste) or Wind It (Nøste). In Harvest, teams had to harvest and clean 10 kilograms (22 lb) of corn to receive their next clue. In Wind It, teams had to make a four-metre (13 ft) long rope out of bark to receive their next clue.
- After the Detour, teams had to choose a guide that would lead them to an Argentine military base camp.
- In this leg's Roadblock, one team member had to complete a military obstacle course to receive their next clue, which directed them to the Pit Stop: the lower trail lookout of Iguazu Falls.

Additional note

- This was a non-elimination leg.

=== Leg 11 (Argentina → Brazil) ===
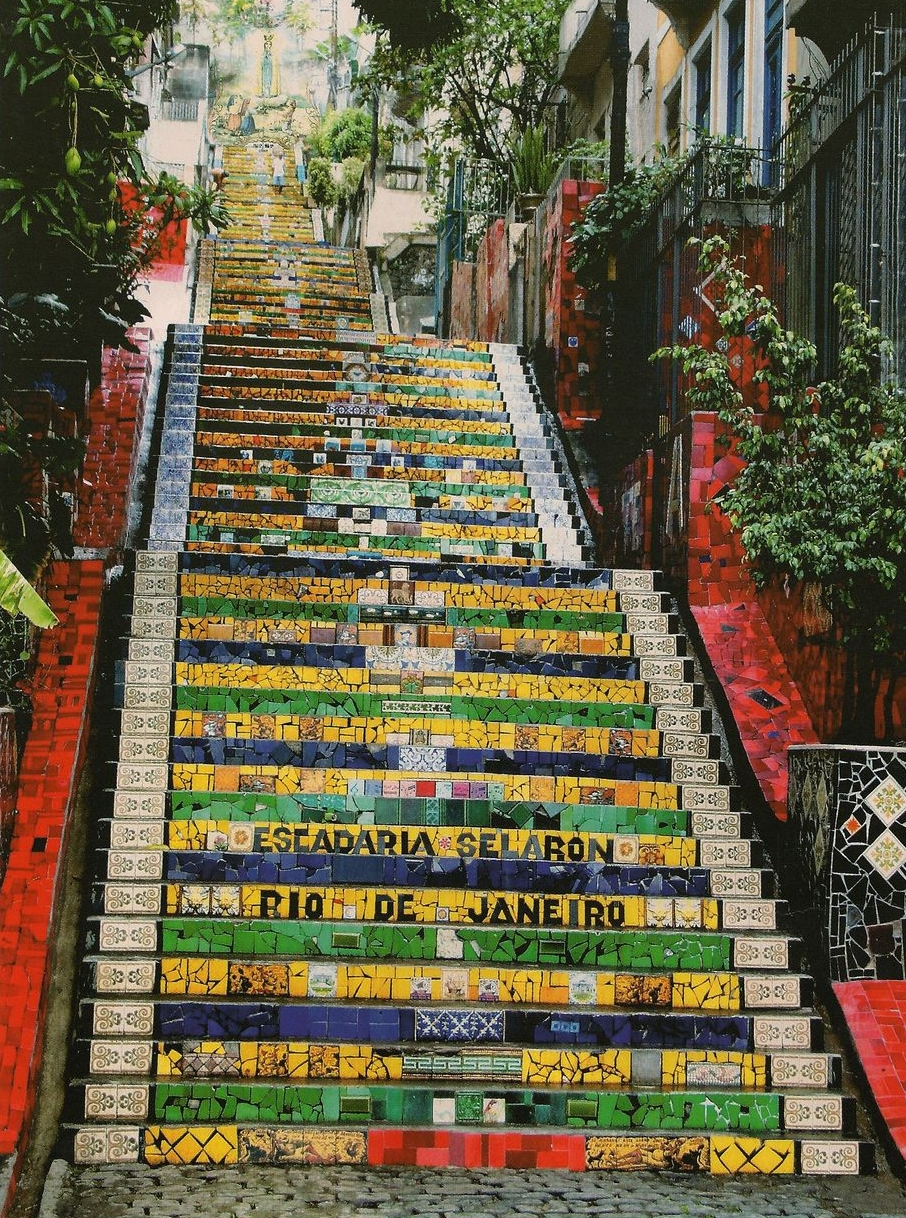
In the Roadblock, racers had to search Escadaria Selarón for pictured tiles.

Airdate: 15 May 2013

- Foz do Iguaçu, Brazil (Itaipu Dam)
- Foz do Iguaçu (Foz do Iguaçu International Airport) → Rio de Janeiro (Santos Dumont Airport)
- Rio de Janeiro (Escadaria Selarón)
- São Gonçalo (Karanba Football Club)
- Niterói (Terminal Araribóia) → Rio de Janeiro (Praça XV)
- Rio de Janeiro (Copacabana Beach)
- Rio de Janeiro (Ipanema Beach – Pier 8)
- Rio de Janeiro (Ipanema Beach – Pier 7)
- Rio de Janeiro (Arpoador Park)

In this leg's Roadblock, one team member had to search for 10 pictured tiles on Escadaria Selaón. When they had found the tiles, they had to write down certain letters, in order to get a code phrase. When they had found out the code phrase (Cesar, cadê minha pista?), they would receive their next clue. For their Handicap, Cecilie & Camilla had to find 15 tiles.

For this season's final Intersection, two teams had to complete against each other in a 10-minute football match. Before the match, both teams had to choose three Karanba players, so it was a five-on-five match. The team that scored more goals received their next clue, while the losing team had to wait for another team. The last team had play an additional game against a team of local players before they could continue racing regardless of the final score.

This season's final Detour was a choice between Nett (Net) or Svett (Sweat). In Nett, teams had to clean and hang up a fishing net. When the fisherman was satisfied with the work, the fisherman would point out the direction to their next clue. In Svett, teams had to learn a Capoeira-dance, and had to perform it in front of a judge. When the judge was satisfied with the performance, the judge would point out the direction to their next clue.

Additional tasks

- At Santos Dumont Airport, team had to collect trolleys to receive their next clue. Since Omar & Bilal came in 1st place in the previous leg, they had to collect 5 trolleys. Julie & Robert had to collect 10 trolleys, Solfrid & Sveinung 15 trolleys and Cecilie & Camilla 20 trolleys.
- After the Roadblock, teams had to find one of four white VW-buses and say "Karanba" to the driver, so that the driver could drive them to their next destination.
- At Copacabana Beach, teams had to find their next clue hidden inside a sandcastle.
- At Pier 8 on Ipanema Beach, teams had to calculate how much ice would melt in an 800-meters (1/2 mile) walk. They had to deliver ice to a judge at Pier 7. There, the ice had to weigh exactly 20 kg (44 lb) for the team to check in at the Pit Stop; otherwise they had to redo the task.

=== Leg 12 (Brazil → Norway) ===
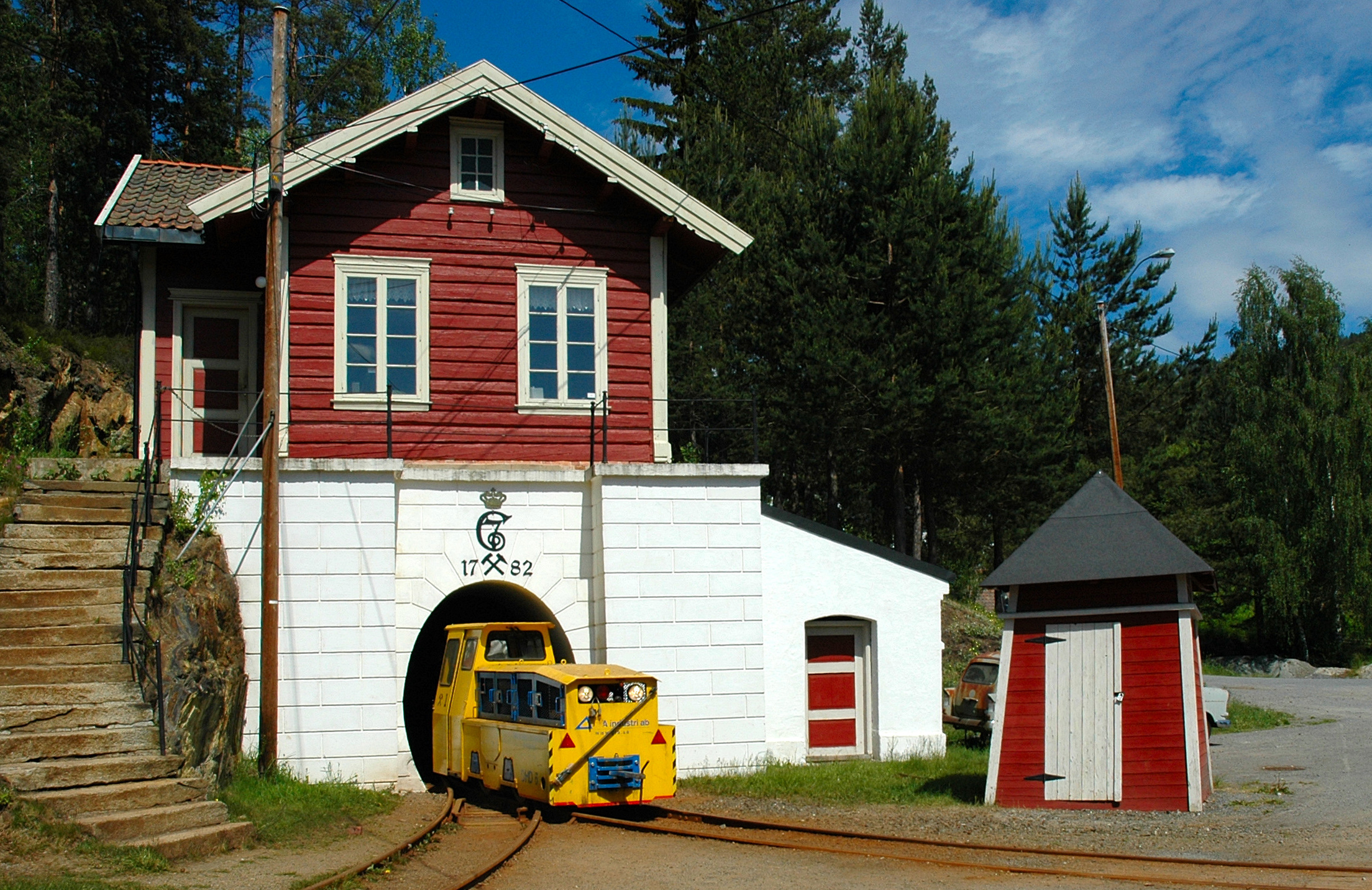
The King's Mine featured tasks and hosted the Finish Line.

Airdate: 22 May 2013

- Rio de Janeiro (Arpoador Park)
- Rio de Janeiro (Leblon Beach)
- Rio de Janeiro (Rio de Janeiro/Galeão International Airport) → Oslo, Norway (Oslo Airport, Gardermoen)
- Ullensaker (Oslo Airport Station) → Drammen (Drammen Station)
- Kongsberg (Magasinparken)
- Kongsberg (Jonas B. Gundersen Jazzkjøkken)
- Kongsberg (FMC Technologies)
- Kongsberg (The Crowns in Håvet)
- Kongsberg (Kongsberg Skisenter)
- Saggrenda (Kongsberg Silver Mines – The King's Mine)

In this season's final Roadblock, one team member had to learn Kongsberg Drikkevise and perform it to the satisfaction of the judge to receive their next clue.

Additional tasks

- At Leblon Beach, teams had to swim out to a buoy and retrieve their picture. Then they had to swim back and place their picture on a board which would be used for their first task in Norway.
- In Drammen, teams had to find one of three cars that was parked in three different locations. The order teams got on the board in Rio de Janeiro, decided how far from the train station in Drammen their car was parked. Solfrid & Sveinung's car was parked 350 meters away from the train station, Omar & Bilal 990 meters away, and Cecilie & Camilla 1,400 meters away.
- At FMC Technologies, teams had to build a model of a subsea pipe coupling for oil and gas. The instructions was written in Portuguese, so they had to find one person that could translate the instruction. Once the coupling was done and approved, they would receive their next clue.
- At FMC Technologies, teams had to navigate a subsea robot to retrieve their next clue, which was eight metres (26 ft) under water.
- At Kongsberg Skisenter, teams had to go Telemark skiing down a black run-hill to receive their next clue.
- Outside the King's Mine, teams had to use hammer and chisel to retrieve their next clue, that was inside a concrete block.
- Inside the King's Mine, teams had to fence against a former national champion and score one point to receive their next clue.
- In front of the Finish Line, teams had to find the right combination of the numbers 2-6-7-8 to open up a safe with their final clue inside. If they typed the wrong combination five times, they had to wait out 5 minutes before they could try again. When teams found the right combination (8-2-7-6, which corresponds to the location of the letters T-A-R-N on a telephone keypad), they could open the safe, retrieve their final clue and run to the Finish Line.
