= The Amazing Race (disambiguation) =

The Amazing Race is a reality television franchise.

The Amazing Race may also refer to:

- The Amazing Race (American TV series), the original American version of the show
- The Amazing Race Asia, an Asian version of the show
- The Amazing Race (Latin American TV series) (formerly known as The Amazing Race en Discovery Channel), a Latin American version of the show
- The Amazing Race: A Corrida Milionária, a Brazilian version of the show
- The Amazing Race: China Rush, a Chinese version of the show
- The Amazing Race China, a celebrity Chinese version of the show
- HaMerotz LaMillion, an Israeli version of the show
- Velyki Perehony, a Ukrainian version of the show
- The Amazing Race Australia, an Australian version of the show
- The Amazing Race Norge, a Norwegian version of the show
- Amazing Race (French TV series), a French version of the show
- The Amazing Race Philippines, a Philippine version of the show
- The Amazing Race Vietnam, a Vietnamese version of the show
- The Amazing Race Canada, a Canadian version of the show

== See also ==
- Amazing Grace (disambiguation)
- The Great Race
- The Amazing Place, a fictional reality show in Heartbreak Hotel (The Simpsons).
