= Palacio Baburizza =

Coordinates: 33.0404°S 71.6289°W

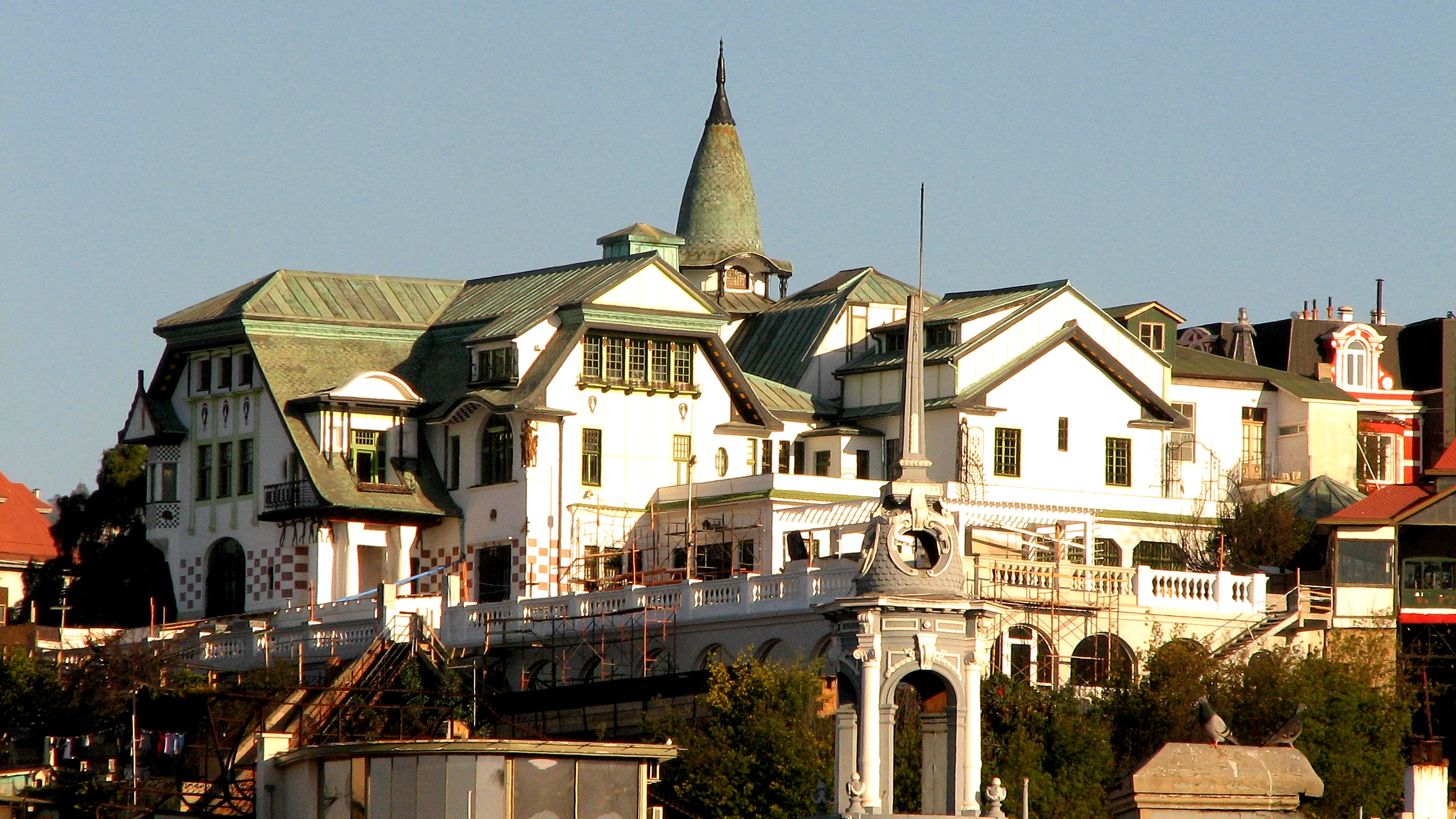
Palacio Baburizza in Valparaíso.

Palacio Baburizza is the former residence of Croatian businessman Pascual Baburizza located in Valparaíso, Chile. It was built in 1916 by Italian architects, and eventually turned into a museum in 1971, and declared a historic monument in 1976.

== History ==
Palacio Baburizza was built upon request from one of the most important families of Valparaiso, the Zanelli family. It was purchased in 1925 by Pascual Baburizza, a distinguished investor in saltpeter mines who managed to have an important fortune in Chile, which was largely devoted to philanthropic works.

In 1971, the palace was bought by the local government of Valparaiso to be used as a museum and a school of Fine Arts. Today, it gathers an important collection of works; many of these bequeathed by Pascual Baburizza. Mauricio Rugendas, Alfredo Valenzuela Puelma, Alfredo Helsby and Carlos Hermosilla Álvarez are among the most important painters.

The museum was closed for renovations in 1997 and reopened in 2011. The building is an Art Nouveau chalet with remarkable details in its woodwork, wrought iron, and central turret.

== Architecture ==
The palace is eclectic in style with clear Art Nouveau elements in its façade and a variety of ornamental elements like towers and columns. The style is also represented by its volumetric units given by the balconies, bow-windows, terraces and attics. Inside, the carved wooden copper-coated door stands out. The dining room has a unique renaissance-style fireplace built on marble and decorated with embossed medallions and braids, and above it, a fine linen tapestry from the 18th century.

== In popular culture ==
Palacio Baburizza appeared on The Amazing Race 16, The Amazing Race Norge 2, and HaMerotz LaMillion 8.
