= James Basker =

American scholar

James G. Basker is an American scholar, writer, and educational leader. He is president of the Gilder Lehrman Institute and Richard Gilder Professor of Literary History at Barnard College, Columbia University.

== Biography ==
He studied English at Harvard College (Phi Beta Kappa) and Cambridge University, and graduated from Oxford University as a Rhodes Scholar, with a D. Phil in English. Basker is currently the Richard Gilder Professor in Literary History at Barnard College, Columbia University, having previously taught at Harvard, Cambridge and NYU. He is also the president of the Gilder Lehrman Institute of American History, founder and former President of the Oxbridge Academic Programs, founder and current Academic Director of Oxford Academia, a fellow of the Society of American Historians, and a member of the American Antiquarian Society. He was elected to the board of the American Association of Rhodes Scholars in 2007.

== Publications ==
Basker’s scholarly work focuses on 18th Century literature, specifically the life and writings of Samuel Johnson and the history of slavery and abolition.

- Tobias Smollett, Critic and Journalist. University of Delaware Press, 1988.
- Tradition in Transition: Women Writers, Marginal Texts, and the Eighteenth-Century Canon. OUP Oxford, 1997.
- Amazing Grace: An Anthology of Poems About Slavery, 1660-1810. Yale University Press, 2002.
- Early American Abolitionists: A Collection of Anti-slavery Writings, 1760-1820. The Gilder Lehrman Institute of American History, New York, 2005.
- Why Documents Matter: American Originals and Historical Imagination (Selections From the Gilder Lehrman Collection). The Gilder Lehrman Institute of American History, New York, 2008.
- American Antislavery Writings: Colonial Beginnings to Emancipation, New York, NY: The Library of America, 2012.
- The Adventures of Roderick Random (The Works of Tobias Smollett). University of Georgia Press, 2014.
- Black Writers of the Founding Era. Library of America, 2023.
- The Witnesses: Fifty Historic Anti-Slavery Poems, 1695–1865. Gilder Lehrman Institute of American History, 2024.

== Personal ==
Dr. Basker currently lives in New York City with his wife, Angela Vallot. They have two daughters, Anne and Katherine.
