= Amazing Grace (disambiguation) =

"Amazing Grace" is a Christian hymn.

Amazing Grace may also refer to:

== Film and television ==
- Amazing Grace (1974 film), a comedy film by Stan Lathan
- Amazing Grace (1992 film), a film by Amos Guttman dealing with LGBT issues and AIDS in Israeli society
- Amazing Grace (2006 film), a film by Michael Apted about the campaign against slave trade in the British Empire, led by William Wilberforce
- The Amazing Grace, a 2006 film by Jeta Amata about the British slave trader John Newton
- Amazing Grace: Jeff Buckley, a 2009 documentary film
- Amazing Grace (2018 film), a documentary by Sydney Pollack about Aretha Franklin
- Amazing Grace (American TV series), a 1995 American drama series
- Amazing Grace (Australian TV series), a 2021 drama series
- "Amazing Grace" (Legends of Tomorrow), an episode of Legends of Tomorrow

== Literature ==
- Amazing Grace (comics), a supervillain from DC Comics
- Amazing Grace (novel), a 2007 novel by Danielle Steel
- Amazing Grace: An Anthology of Poems about Slavery, 2002
- Amazing Grace, a children's book by Mary Hoffman

== Music ==
=== Albums ===
- Amazing Grace (The Badlees album), 1999
- Amazing Grace (Judy Collins album), 1985
- Amazing Grace (Aretha Franklin album), 1972
- Amazing Grace (Lesley Garrett album), 2008
- Amazing Grace (Sissel album), 1994
- Amazing Grace (Spiritualized album), 2003
- Amazing Grace: His Greatest Sacred Performances, by Elvis Presley, 1999
- Amazing Grace: Songs for Christmas, an EP by Paulini, 2004
- Amazing Grace (score), composed by David Arnold, from the 2006 Michael Apted film, 2007
- Amazing Grace (soundtrack), by various artists, from the Michael Apted film, 2007

=== Songs ===
- "Amazing Grace (Used to Be Her Favorite Song)", by Amazing Rhythm Aces, 1975
- "Amazing Grace (My Chains Are Gone)", a reworking of the hymn, by Chris Tomlin from See the Morning, 2006
- "Amazing Grace", a song by Boy George from Ordinary Alien, 2010
- "Amazing Grace", a song by DaBaby from Blame It on Baby, 2020
- "Amazing Grace", a song by Elias from WWE: Universal Truth, 2020

== Other uses ==
- Amazing Grace (musical), a 2015 Broadway musical
- Amazing Grace (ship), a topsail schooner
- Grace Hopper or Amazing Grace (1906–1992), American computer scientist and naval officer
- Grace McCarthy or Amazing Grace (1927–2017), Canadian politician

== See also ==
- Amazing Grace and Chuck, a 1987 film by Mike Newell
