= Oxbridge Academic Programs =

Summer programs

Oxbridge Academic Programs is an organization offering summer academic programs in Europe for American and other high school students. Courses are offered in Oxford, Cambridge, Paris, and Barcelona, as well as New York. Since 2014, the programs have been owned and operated by a company called WorldStrides.

== History ==
The programs were founded in 1985 by James Basker, who is no longer affiliated with the programs. Basker is a professor at Barnard College in New York, is a former Rhodes Scholar, and earned a master's degree from University of Cambridge and a doctorate from University of Oxford. In the 1990s, the program offered summer courses in the humanities, social sciences, and the creative arts to American high school sophomores, juniors, and seniors. The courses were held on university campuses at Cambridge, Oxford, or Paris, and included field trips.

As of 2020, Oxbridge Academic Programs also offered educator seminars, offering teachers the chance to study subjects such as environmental studies and mathematics with academic scholars, writers, and public figures at Oxford and Cambridge.

== Scholarships ==
WorldStrides offers scholarships and grants based on financial need and merit.
