= Kongsberg Skisenter =

Ski resort in Buskerud, Norway

Coordinates: 59.6625°N 9.6200°E

Kongsberg Skiresort
- Interactive map of Kongsberg Skiresort
- Location: Kongsberg, Buskerud county, Norway
- Nearest city: Kongsberg
- Top elevation: 565 m (1,854 ft)
- Base elevation: 235 m (771 ft)
- Website: skimore.no/kongsberg/

Kongsberg Skisenter is a ski resort located in Funkelia in Kongsberg, Norway. It is owned by Skisenterdrift AS which also bought the ski resort Grefsenkollen Skisenter in 2006.

== Information ==
The resort has 10 slopes which accumulate approximately 10 kilometers of tracks, one chair elevator and four lifts. The capacity of the elevators is 7200 persons per hour. The highest point is 565 meters above sea, while the lowest is 235, giving a height difference of 330 meters. In 2009 the resort had a turnover of 34,8 million Norwegian Kroner and a profit of 9,8 million Norwegian Kroner. There is also 55 kilometers of prepared tracks for cross country skiing.

== Slopes ==
- Green - Easy slope
  - Turisten (2200 m)
  - Barnebakken (150 m)
- Blue - Easy to medium
  - Konningen Skicrossbakke (1900 m)
  - Avstikker´n (300 m)
- Red - Medium to hard
  - Ormen Lange (1800 m)
  - Tversover´n (200 m)
- Black - Hard
  - Eksperten (1700 m)
  - Slalåmen (500 m)
