= Transport in Oslo =

The county and city of Oslo has an extensive transportation infrastructure system. The public transportation system includes metro lines, trams, buses and airports. Railways and roadways connect the city to the rest of Norway and locations in neighboring countries.

Oslo's public transport authority, Ruter, is responsible for the administration and funding of public transport, as well as oversight of ticketing and pricing systems for the city's metros, trams, buses, ferries, and local trains.

Sporveien operates and maintains both the tramway network and the metro network of Oslo. Sporveien has been doing this for about a hundred years, beginning when Oslo Sporveier was first established.

== Road transport ==
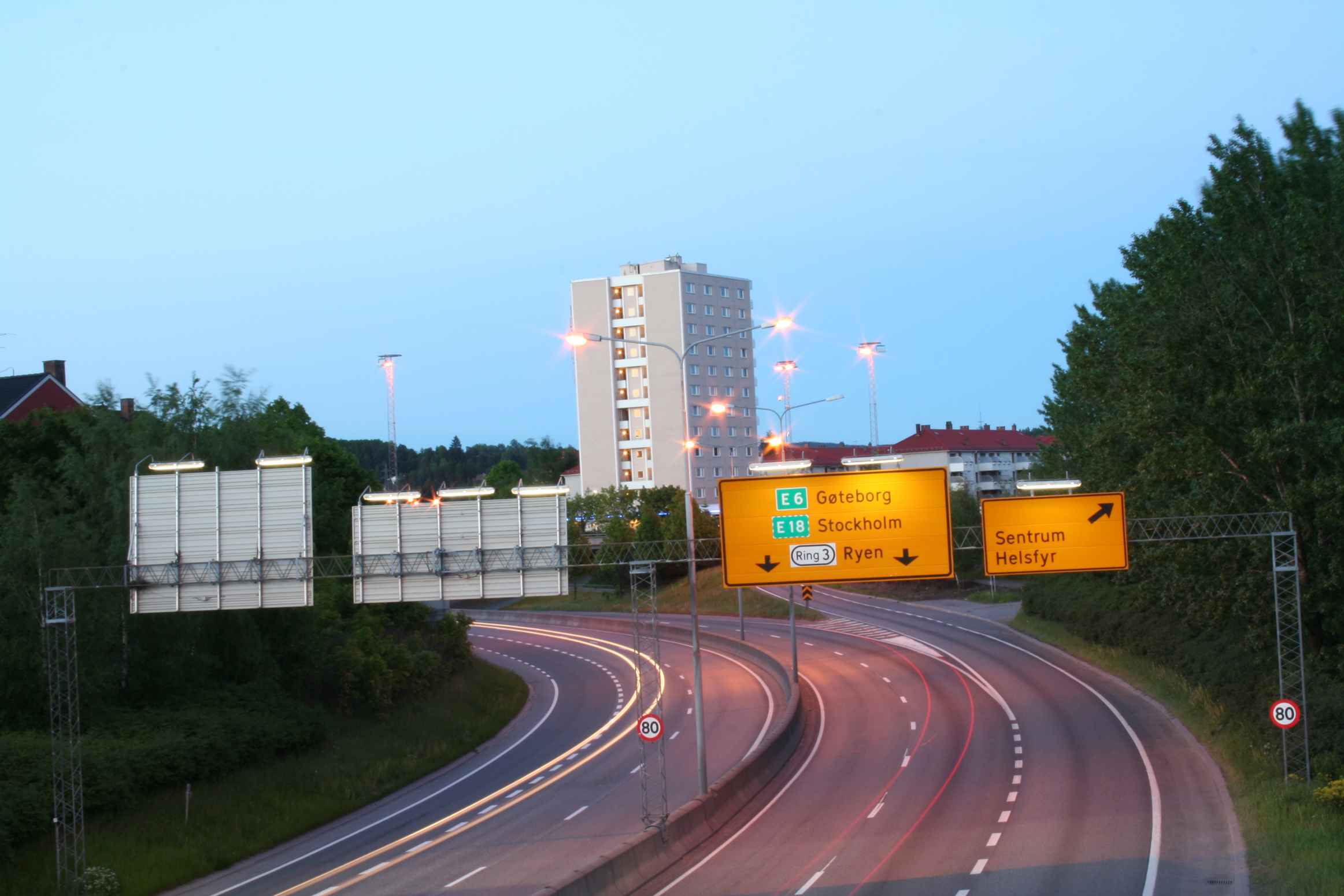
A section of road shared by Ring 3 and European route E6

=== Roads ===
European routes E6 and E18 are the main highways entering Oslo. Many parts of these motorways are tunneled beneath the city center. A series of three ring roads encircle Oslo; the two innermost ring roads, Ring 1 and Ring 2, are surface city streets, while Ring 3 is an expressway. The construction of roads is partially supported through a toll ring. On Ring 1 and 2, you pay the toll every time you drive by a toll point. On Ring 3, however, you only pay when you're entering the city. The toll ring also helps finance other public projects, like the Fornebu Line currently under construction.

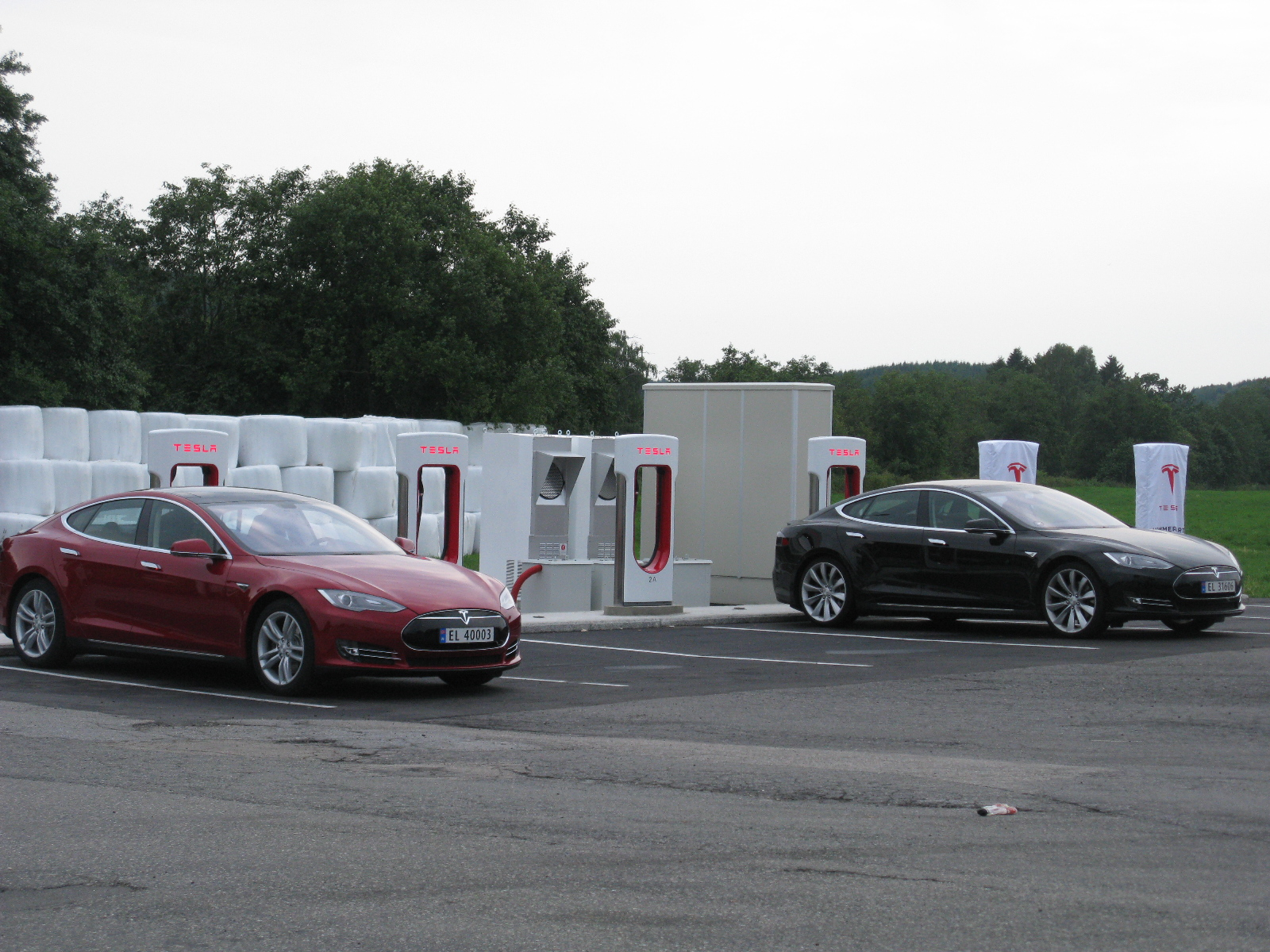
Two Tesla Models S charging at a Tesla Supercharger in Norway

=== Electric vehicles ===
Oslo has made an effort since the late 2000s in promoting the use of electric vehicles above fossil-fueled vehicles. Oslo has been called the electric vehicle capital of the world, as 41% of all registered cars in the municipality are fully electric. In September 2021, the number of electric vehicles entering Oslo's toll ring was higher than the number of fossil-fueled vehicles. The high number of electric vehicles in Oslo can be attributed to cheaper tolls, no vehicle import tax, no VAT, free parking, and access to bus lanes throughout the city.

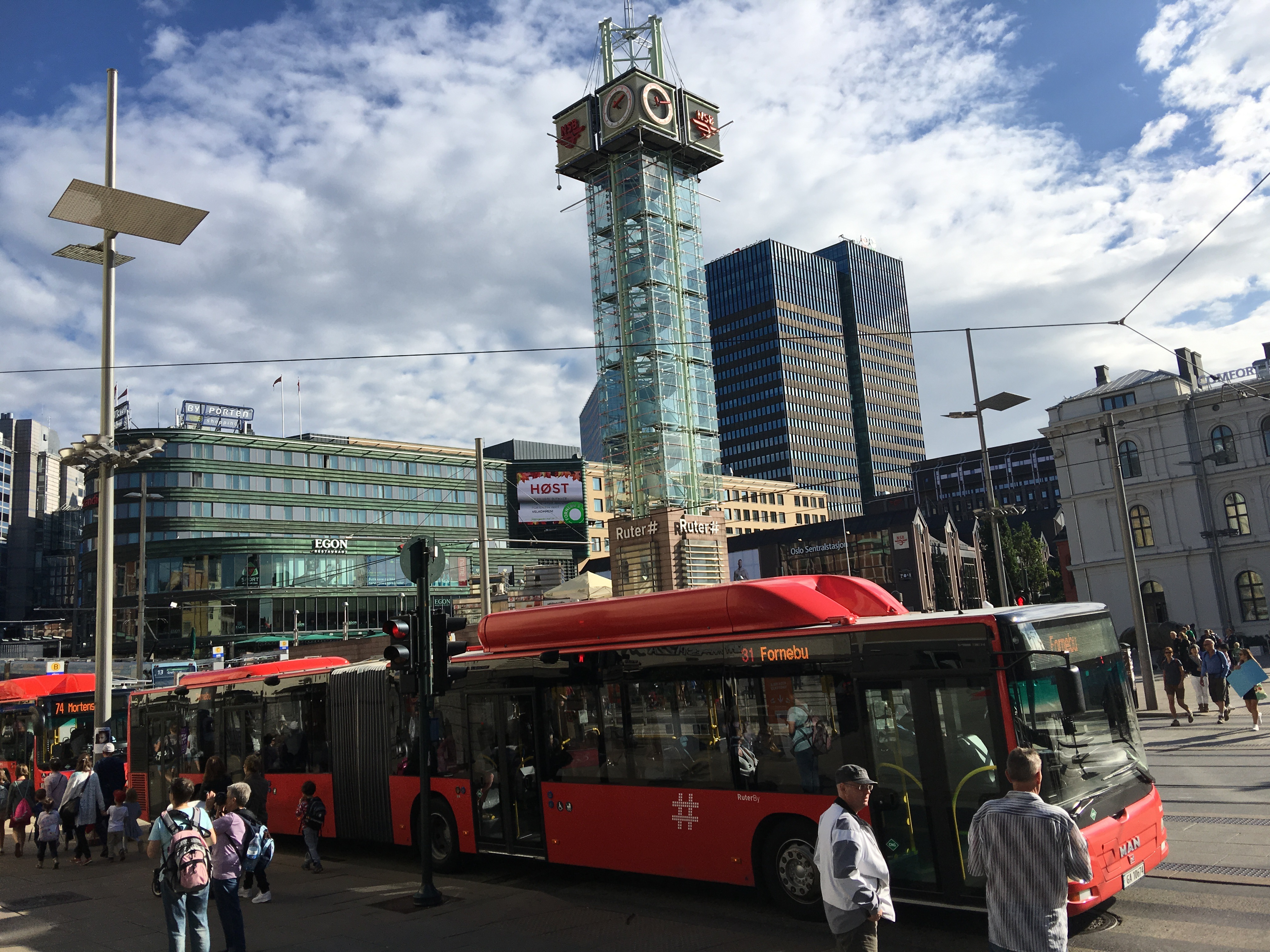
Buses lining up on Jernbanetorget station

=== Buses ===
Oslo has a total of 50 inner-city bus lines, excluding buses that connect with greater Akershus. These inner-city bus lines act as a final overlay of transportation in Oslo, after the metro and tram network, making travel by public transportation possible to every corner of the city. Some of the most trafficked routes can have departures almost every minute, like 31 Fornebu, which has around 50 departures towards the Fornebu peninsula every hour during peak times.

== Rail transport ==
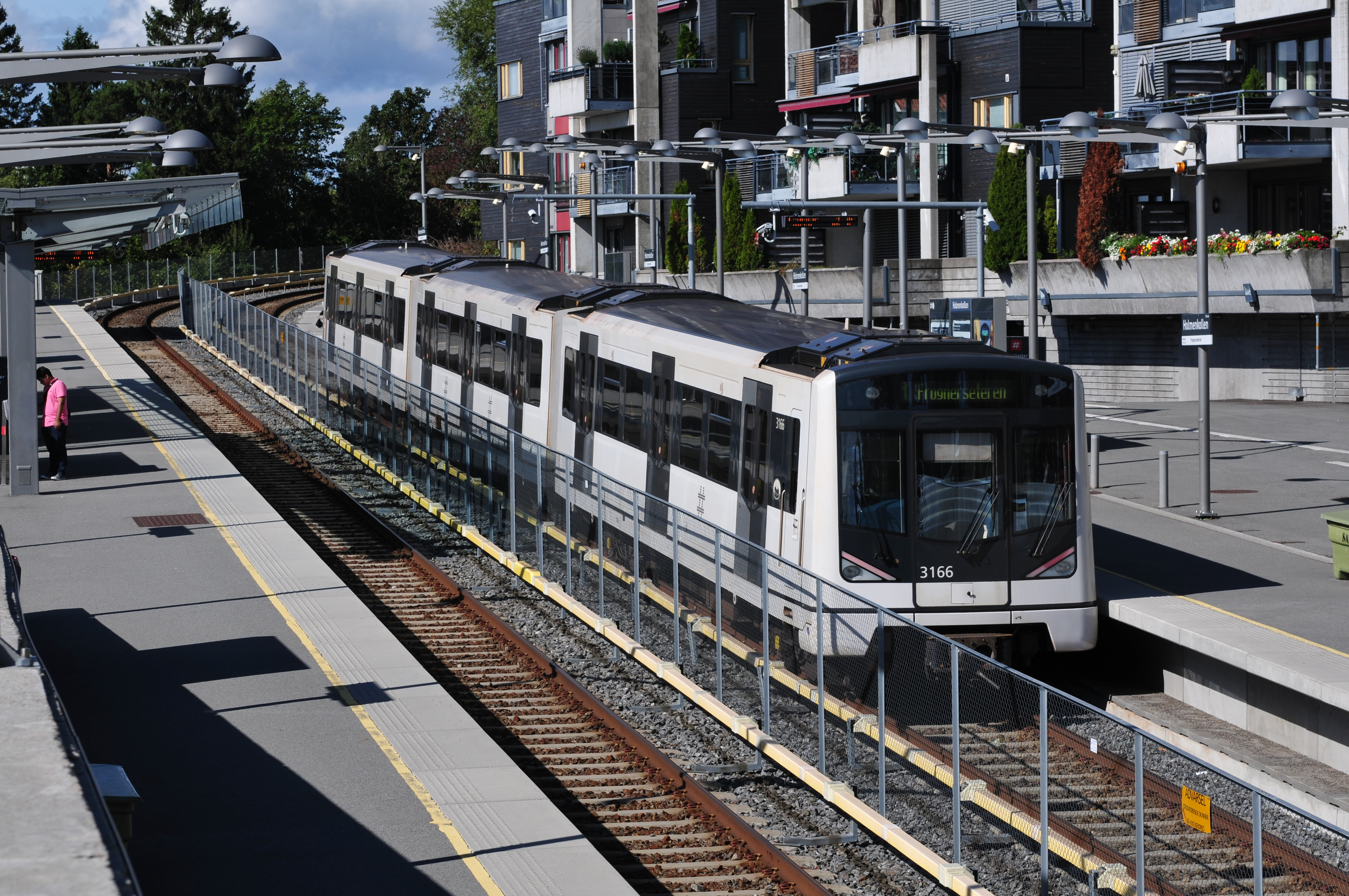
MX3000 at Holmenkollen station

=== Metro ===
The Oslo Metro (Norwegian: Oslo T-bane or simply T-banen) is the rapid transit network of Oslo. It operates five lines that cover the entire city. The Common Tunnel runs underneath the city center, and all five lines use it. The Oslo metro is run by Sporveien, and the total length of the metro line is 85 km (53 mi) , serving 101 stations in total. 14 out of 15 boroughs of Oslo are currently served by the Metro system. The Fornebu Line is a new line that's currently under construction. The new line is going to serve the peninsula of Fornebu, as well as the neighborhoods of Skøyen and Lysaker.

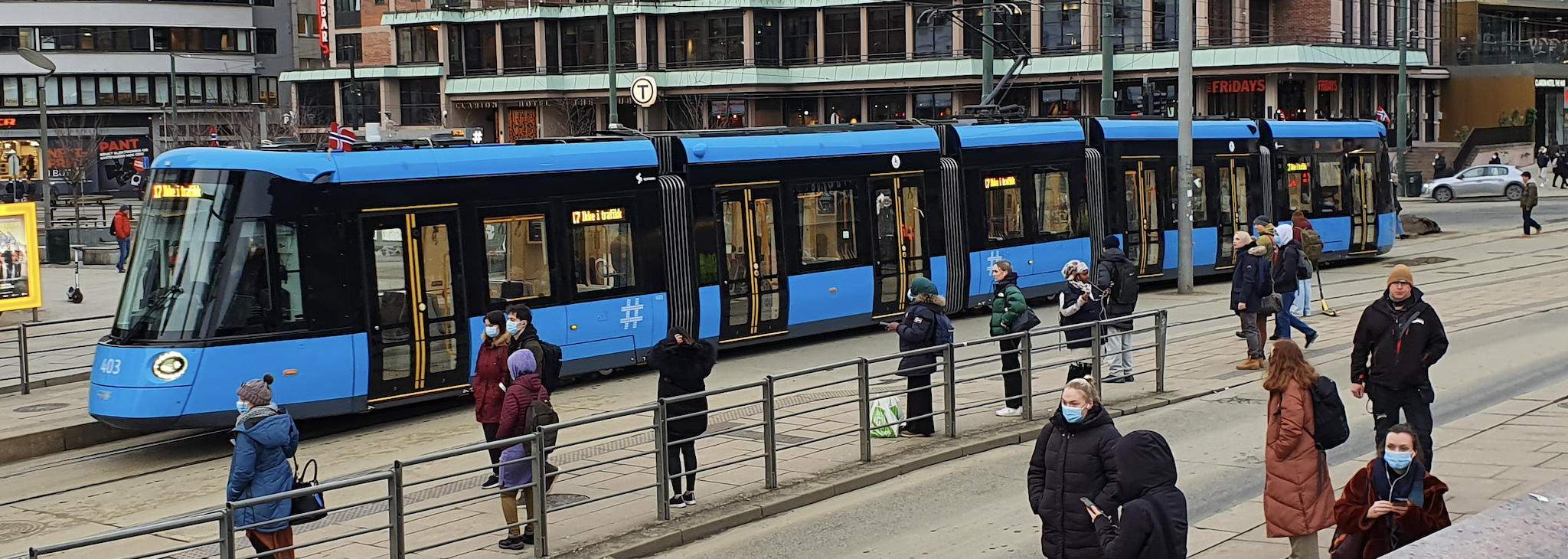
The new SL18-model tram

=== Trams ===
The Oslo tram network runs primarily on the road network (though it does run on portions of dedicated right-of-way too), and is operated by Sporveien Trikken. It has six lines operating within areas close to the city center. The new low-floor SL18-model tram is set to replace the older SL79 and SL95 models within 2024.

=== Railways ===
Map of the railway lines in Norway. — electrified lines — non-electrified lines — disused or heritage lines

Oslo Central Station (Oslo S) is the terminus for several railway lines. Vy operates most of Norway's passenger rail services, including the Oslo Commuter Rail which connects to six counties in Eastern Norway. They operate regional and express trains from Oslo to several Norwegian destinations - including Drammen, Lillehammer and Halden - and to Gothenburg and Stockholm in neighboring Sweden.

Flytoget runs from Drammen to Gardermoen Airport and connects Drammen and Oslo to the airport via a high-speed rail link.

== Air transport ==
Oslo Gardermoen Airport is located 35 km (22 mi) northeast of Oslo and is Norway's main airport. Domestic flights operate to most European countries, and there are scheduled international flights to select locations in North America, Africa, and Asia. It is a primary hub for Scandinavian Airlines, Widerøe and Norwegian Air Shuttle. The Flytoget rail link connects Gardermoen to the city.

Sandefjord Airport is located 110 km (68 mi) south of Oslo and is mostly used by low-cost airline Wizz Air.

== Water transport ==
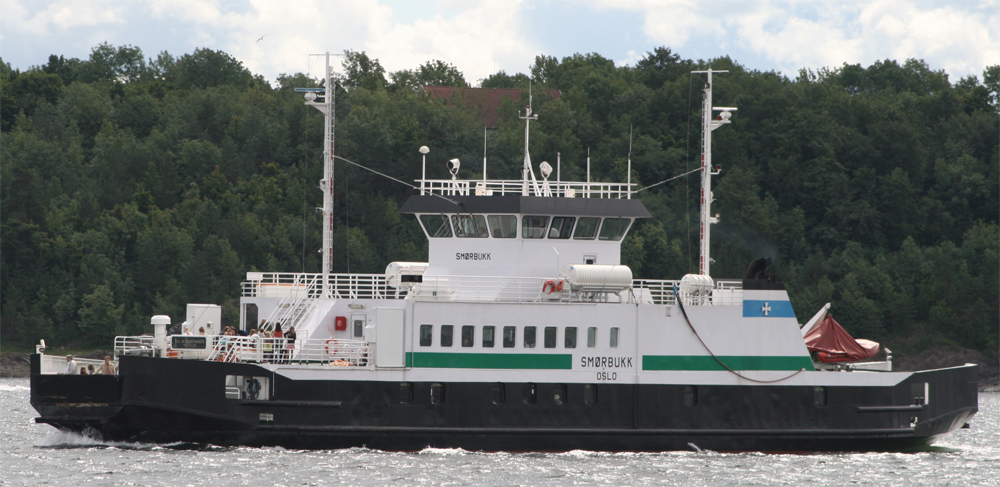
The ferry Smørbukk

Oslo has local ferries that service different locations around the Oslofjord. Major operators include Bygdøyfergene, Nesoddbåtene, and Oslo-Fergene. Oslo also has ferry connections to Denmark, Sweden, and Germany. Water transport in Oslo is also part of public transportation, as ferries (except the Bygdøy ferry) are included in the ticket and price system (which are also for the buses, trams, subways and local trains) operated by Ruter.

The majority of ferry services depart from Akerbrygge, a pier located in Central Oslo. From there, ferries will either service routes that will take passengers to the islands, or routes that take them to either the western coast of the Oslofjord.

Norway plans to launch five new electric ferries in Oslo in 2021, as part of its services for the Inner Oslofjord islands, a popular tourist destination. The 350-seat boats will be fully operational by 2022.

Norway is preparing to create the world's first zero-emissions zone on water, in a bid to protect its UNESCO-listed fjords, which attract many tourist cruise ships. The country's parliament passed a resolution to ban greenhouse gas emissions on its world heritage fjords, "as soon as technically possible and no later than 2026".

== See also ==
- Oslo Public Transport Administration
- Ring Line (Oslo)
