= Amazing Grace: An Anthology of Poems about Slavery =

Anthology of poems edited by James Basker

Amazing Grace: An Anthology of Poems about Slavery, 1660–1810 is a volume featuring more than 400 poems or poetic fragments by 250 Anglophone writers, edited by James Basker. Most of the works are from the period between 1760 and 1810, reflecting growth in public awareness about slavery. Most of the poetry is antislavery, with a few exceptions including verse by John Saffin and James Boswell, who defended slavery as an institution.

Published in 2002 by Yale University Press, a revised edition was released in 2005.
