= The Amazing Race Norge =

Norwegian adventure reality game show

- Genre: Reality competition
- Created by: Elise Doganieri; Bertram van Munster
- Based on: The Amazing Race by: Bertram van Munster; Elise Doganieri
- Presented by: Freddy dos Santos
- Theme music composer: John M. Keane
- Country of origin: Norway
- Original language: Norwegian
- No. of seasons: 2
- No. of episodes: 27

Production
- Executive producer: Stein Johnsen (season 1)
- Producer: Eirik Aure
- Production location: See below
- Editor: Torkil G. Auran
- Camera setup: Multi-camera
- Production company: Rubicon TV

Original release
- Network: TV 2
- Release: 11 April 2012 – 22 May 2013

Related
- International versions

The Amazing Race Norge is a Norwegian reality competition show based on the American series The Amazing Race. Following the premise of other versions in the Amazing Race franchise, the show follows teams of two as they race around the world. Each season is split into legs, with teams tasked to deduce clues, navigate themselves in foreign areas, interact with locals, perform physical and mental challenges, and travel by air, boat, car, taxi, and other modes of transport. Teams are progressively eliminated at the end of most legs for being the last to arrive at designated Pit Stops. The first team to arrive at the Finish Line wins a grand prize: a cash prize of 500,000 kr and a new Subaru Forester for each team member.

In October 2011, a Norwegian version of the show was announced by TV 2. Applications were open from 11 October 2011 to 31 October 2011. Filming took place in January 2012. Ex-football player Freddy dos Santos is the presenter of The Amazing Race Norge. The first season premiered on 11 April 2012.

It is produced by Rubicon TV in association with ABC Studios.

== The Race ==
The Amazing Race Norge is a reality television competition between teams of two in a race around the world. Each season is divided into a number of legs wherein teams travel and complete various tasks to obtain clues to help them progress to a Pit Stop where teams are given a chance to rest and recover before starting the next leg. The first team to arrive at a Pit Stop is often awarded a prize, while the last team is normally eliminated (except in non-elimination legs, where the last team to arrive may be penalised in the following leg). The final leg is run by the last three remaining teams, and the first to arrive at the final destination wins the prize.

=== Teams ===
Each team is composed of two individuals who have some type of relationship to each other. 42 people have participated so far.

=== Route Markers ===
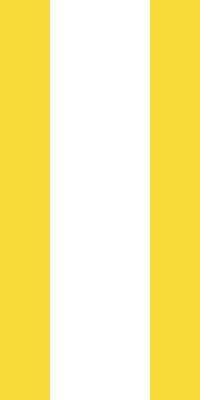

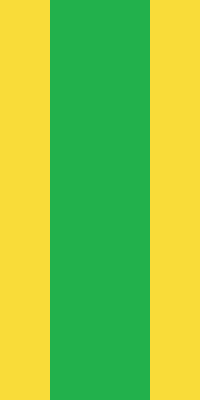

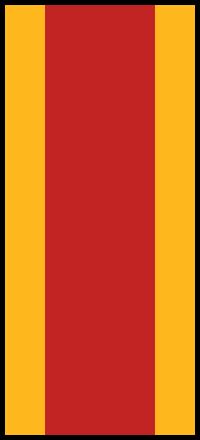

Route Markers are yellow and white flags; yellow and green flags; and yellow and red flags that mark the places where teams must go in order to complete tasks, or may be used to line a course that the teams must follow.

=== Clues ===
Clues are found throughout the legs in sealed envelopes, normally inside clue boxes. They give teams the information they need and tasks they need to do in order for them to progress.

- Veiviser (Route Info): A general clue that may include a task to be completed by the team before they can receive their next clue.
- Veivalg (Detour): A choice of two tasks. Teams are free to choose either task or swap tasks if they find one option too difficult.
- Veisperring (Roadblock): A task only one team member can complete. Teams must choose which member will complete the task based on a brief clue about the task before fully revealing the details of the task.
- Snarvei (Fast Forward): A task that only one team may complete, allowing that team to skip all remaining tasks and head directly for the next Pit Stop. Teams may only claim one Fast Forward during the season. Though prominently featured on the website's pictures and glossaries, no Fast Forward ever appeared on the show.

=== Obstacles ===
During the race, teams may face the following which may potentially slow them down:

- U-Sving (U-Turn): It is located after a Detour where a team can force another trailing team to return and complete the other option of the Detour they did not select.
- Veikryss (Intersection): It is where two teams compete to receive their next clue. The team who wins the challenge will get their next clue while the losing team must then wait for another team to arrive to redo the challenge. The cycle repeats until the last team left will have to, again, repeat the challenge.

=== Legs ===
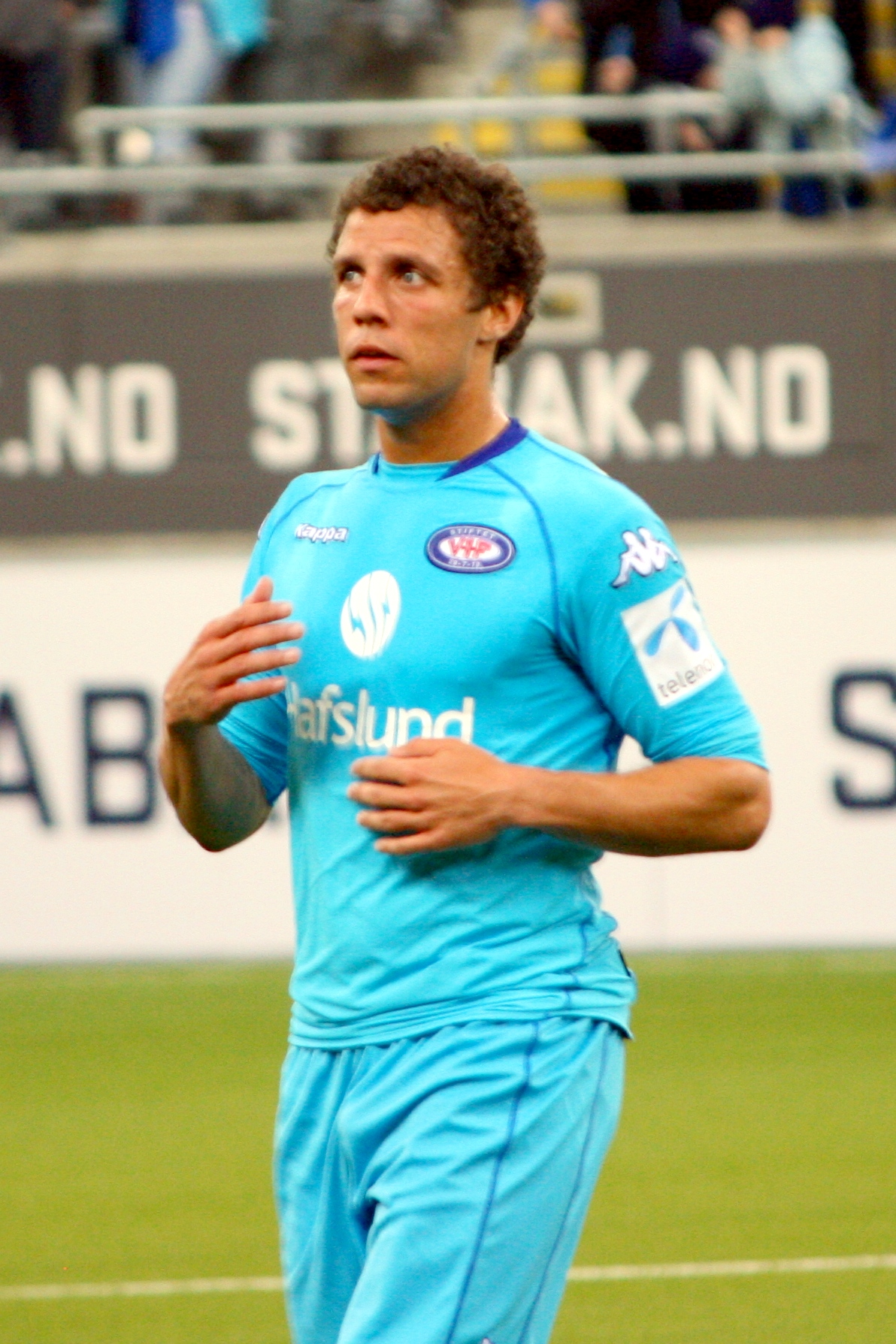
Host Freddy dos Santos

At the beginning of each leg, teams receive an allowance of cash to cover expenses during the legs (except for the purchase of airline tickets, which are paid-for by provided credit cards).

Teams then have to follow clues and Route Markers that will lead them to the various destinations and tasks they will face. Modes of travel between these destinations include commercial and chartered airplanes, boats, trains, taxis, buses, and rented vehicles provided by the show, or the teams may simply travel by foot. Each leg ends with a Pit Stop (Pitstop) where teams are able to rest and where teams that arrive last are progressively eliminated from the race until only three teams remain. In some legs, the first teams to arrive at the Pit Stop win prizes, usually from the show's sponsors.

- Fripass (The Express Pass) was awarded to the winners of the third leg of season 1 that can be used to skip any one task of the team's choosing up until the 8th leg. If a team gets eliminated without using their Express Pass, the winner of the last leg gets the Express Pass.

==== Non-elimination Legs ====
Each season has a number of predetermined non-elimination legs, in which the last team to arrive at the Pit Stop is not eliminated and is allowed to continue.

- Handikap (Handicap): A task that a team that comes last in a non-elimination leg has to complete. Teams handicapped are penalised by either having a certain task made harder for them in the next leg or by being penalised.

=== Rules and penalties ===
Most of the rules and penalties are adopted directly from the American edition; but in some of cases, this version has been seen to have a unique set of additional rules.

== Seasons ==
The show first aired in 2012 with the first-season premiere airing on 11 April 2012 and ending 30 May 2012.

Season	Broadcast		Winners	Teams
Season	Premiere date	Finale date	Winners	Teams
1	11 April 2012	30 May 2012	Morten & Truls Bjerke	11
2	6 March 2013	22 May 2013	Omar & Bilal Ishqair	10

== Countries and locales visited ==
As of the second season, The Amazing Race Norge has visited 13 countries and 5 continents.

Countries that The Amazing Race Norge has visited are shown in colour.

=== Europe ===
Rank	Country	Season visited	Pit Stops
1	Norway	2 (All)	2^{1}

=== Africa ===
Rank	Country	Season visited	Pit Stops
1	Namibia	1 (2)	2
1	South Africa	1 (2)	2

=== South America ===
Rank	Country	Season visited	Pit Stops
1	Argentina	1 (2)	4
1	Brazil	1 (2)	1
1	Chile	1 (2)	2

=== Asia ===
Rank	Country	Season visited	Pit Stops
1	China	1 (1)	2^{2}
1	India	1 (1)	2
1	Kazakhstan	1 (1)	1
1	Thailand	1 (1)	1
1	United Arab Emirates	1 (1)	1
1	Vietnam	1 (1)	2

=== Oceania ===
Rank	Country	Season visited	Pit Stops
1	Australia	1 (1)	3

=== Notes ===
1. ^1 Includes 2 Finish Lines.
2. ^2 Only the Special Administrative Regions of Hong Kong and Macau (1).

== Awards and nominations ==
The show was nominated for the Norwegian TV Gullruten awards for best competitive reality show in 2013.

Summary of Awards and Nominations
Year	Award	Category	Nominated	Result	Ref
2013	Gullruten	Best Competitive Reality Show	Season 1	Nominated	
